

181001–181100 

|-bgcolor=#E9E9E9
| 181001 ||  || — || July 3, 2005 || Mount Lemmon || Mount Lemmon Survey || HOF || align=right | 3.7 km || 
|-id=002 bgcolor=#fefefe
| 181002 ||  || — || July 5, 2005 || Mount Lemmon || Mount Lemmon Survey || V || align=right data-sort-value="0.92" | 920 m || 
|-id=003 bgcolor=#fefefe
| 181003 ||  || — || July 7, 2005 || Kitt Peak || Spacewatch || EUT || align=right | 1.0 km || 
|-id=004 bgcolor=#fefefe
| 181004 ||  || — || July 7, 2005 || Kitt Peak || Spacewatch || NYS || align=right | 1.0 km || 
|-id=005 bgcolor=#d6d6d6
| 181005 ||  || — || July 4, 2005 || Palomar || NEAT || — || align=right | 4.2 km || 
|-id=006 bgcolor=#E9E9E9
| 181006 ||  || — || July 10, 2005 || Kitt Peak || Spacewatch || — || align=right | 1.7 km || 
|-id=007 bgcolor=#d6d6d6
| 181007 ||  || — || July 10, 2005 || Kitt Peak || Spacewatch || EOS || align=right | 3.0 km || 
|-id=008 bgcolor=#fefefe
| 181008 ||  || — || July 5, 2005 || Palomar || NEAT || — || align=right | 1.4 km || 
|-id=009 bgcolor=#fefefe
| 181009 ||  || — || July 13, 2005 || RAS || A. Lowe || — || align=right | 1.4 km || 
|-id=010 bgcolor=#E9E9E9
| 181010 ||  || — || July 1, 2005 || Kitt Peak || Spacewatch || — || align=right | 1.7 km || 
|-id=011 bgcolor=#E9E9E9
| 181011 ||  || — || July 1, 2005 || Kitt Peak || Spacewatch || AGN || align=right | 1.5 km || 
|-id=012 bgcolor=#d6d6d6
| 181012 ||  || — || July 2, 2005 || Kitt Peak || Spacewatch || KOR || align=right | 1.7 km || 
|-id=013 bgcolor=#d6d6d6
| 181013 ||  || — || July 9, 2005 || Kitt Peak || Spacewatch || KOR || align=right | 1.7 km || 
|-id=014 bgcolor=#E9E9E9
| 181014 ||  || — || July 9, 2005 || Kitt Peak || Spacewatch || MIS || align=right | 3.2 km || 
|-id=015 bgcolor=#E9E9E9
| 181015 ||  || — || July 11, 2005 || Mount Lemmon || Mount Lemmon Survey || — || align=right | 2.8 km || 
|-id=016 bgcolor=#E9E9E9
| 181016 ||  || — || July 11, 2005 || Kitt Peak || Spacewatch || AGN || align=right | 1.5 km || 
|-id=017 bgcolor=#E9E9E9
| 181017 ||  || — || July 11, 2005 || Kitt Peak || Spacewatch || — || align=right | 1.6 km || 
|-id=018 bgcolor=#d6d6d6
| 181018 ||  || — || July 12, 2005 || Bergisch Gladbach || W. Bickel || — || align=right | 4.5 km || 
|-id=019 bgcolor=#d6d6d6
| 181019 ||  || — || July 2, 2005 || Kitt Peak || Spacewatch || HYG || align=right | 4.5 km || 
|-id=020 bgcolor=#d6d6d6
| 181020 ||  || — || July 3, 2005 || Mount Lemmon || Mount Lemmon Survey || KOR || align=right | 1.8 km || 
|-id=021 bgcolor=#E9E9E9
| 181021 ||  || — || July 9, 2005 || Kitt Peak || Spacewatch || — || align=right | 3.0 km || 
|-id=022 bgcolor=#fefefe
| 181022 ||  || — || July 10, 2005 || Kitt Peak || Spacewatch || V || align=right | 1.0 km || 
|-id=023 bgcolor=#E9E9E9
| 181023 ||  || — || July 7, 2005 || Mauna Kea || C. Veillet || — || align=right data-sort-value="0.98" | 980 m || 
|-id=024 bgcolor=#E9E9E9
| 181024 ||  || — || July 7, 2005 || Mauna Kea || C. Veillet || — || align=right | 2.0 km || 
|-id=025 bgcolor=#fefefe
| 181025 ||  || — || July 28, 2005 || Reedy Creek || J. Broughton || — || align=right | 1.3 km || 
|-id=026 bgcolor=#E9E9E9
| 181026 ||  || — || July 29, 2005 || Palomar || NEAT || WIT || align=right | 1.3 km || 
|-id=027 bgcolor=#d6d6d6
| 181027 ||  || — || July 28, 2005 || Palomar || NEAT || — || align=right | 4.6 km || 
|-id=028 bgcolor=#fefefe
| 181028 ||  || — || July 27, 2005 || Palomar || NEAT || — || align=right | 1.2 km || 
|-id=029 bgcolor=#fefefe
| 181029 ||  || — || July 27, 2005 || Palomar || NEAT || NYS || align=right | 1.2 km || 
|-id=030 bgcolor=#fefefe
| 181030 ||  || — || July 28, 2005 || Palomar || NEAT || NYS || align=right | 1.1 km || 
|-id=031 bgcolor=#d6d6d6
| 181031 ||  || — || July 29, 2005 || Palomar || NEAT || — || align=right | 4.8 km || 
|-id=032 bgcolor=#d6d6d6
| 181032 ||  || — || July 29, 2005 || Palomar || NEAT || EOS || align=right | 3.2 km || 
|-id=033 bgcolor=#fefefe
| 181033 ||  || — || July 29, 2005 || Palomar || NEAT || NYS || align=right | 1.3 km || 
|-id=034 bgcolor=#d6d6d6
| 181034 ||  || — || July 28, 2005 || Palomar || NEAT || KOR || align=right | 1.7 km || 
|-id=035 bgcolor=#E9E9E9
| 181035 ||  || — || July 28, 2005 || Palomar || NEAT || — || align=right | 2.7 km || 
|-id=036 bgcolor=#d6d6d6
| 181036 ||  || — || July 28, 2005 || Palomar || NEAT || — || align=right | 3.3 km || 
|-id=037 bgcolor=#d6d6d6
| 181037 ||  || — || July 29, 2005 || Palomar || NEAT || — || align=right | 4.3 km || 
|-id=038 bgcolor=#d6d6d6
| 181038 ||  || — || July 29, 2005 || Palomar || NEAT || — || align=right | 6.7 km || 
|-id=039 bgcolor=#d6d6d6
| 181039 ||  || — || July 30, 2005 || Palomar || NEAT || — || align=right | 3.7 km || 
|-id=040 bgcolor=#E9E9E9
| 181040 ||  || — || July 31, 2005 || Palomar || NEAT || — || align=right | 3.1 km || 
|-id=041 bgcolor=#E9E9E9
| 181041 ||  || — || July 30, 2005 || Palomar || NEAT || — || align=right | 2.5 km || 
|-id=042 bgcolor=#E9E9E9
| 181042 ||  || — || July 16, 2005 || Catalina || CSS || — || align=right | 3.2 km || 
|-id=043 bgcolor=#d6d6d6
| 181043 Anan || 2005 PV ||  || August 4, 2005 || Nakagawa || H. Hori, H. Maeno || — || align=right | 5.3 km || 
|-id=044 bgcolor=#E9E9E9
| 181044 ||  || — || August 1, 2005 || Siding Spring || SSS || — || align=right | 3.7 km || 
|-id=045 bgcolor=#d6d6d6
| 181045 ||  || — || August 1, 2005 || Siding Spring || SSS || EOS || align=right | 3.2 km || 
|-id=046 bgcolor=#fefefe
| 181046 ||  || — || August 2, 2005 || Socorro || LINEAR || MAS || align=right | 1.3 km || 
|-id=047 bgcolor=#fefefe
| 181047 ||  || — || August 4, 2005 || Palomar || NEAT || — || align=right | 1.6 km || 
|-id=048 bgcolor=#d6d6d6
| 181048 ||  || — || August 6, 2005 || Reedy Creek || J. Broughton || MEL || align=right | 6.6 km || 
|-id=049 bgcolor=#fefefe
| 181049 ||  || — || August 4, 2005 || Palomar || NEAT || — || align=right | 2.0 km || 
|-id=050 bgcolor=#fefefe
| 181050 ||  || — || August 2, 2005 || Reedy Creek || J. Broughton || — || align=right | 1.5 km || 
|-id=051 bgcolor=#E9E9E9
| 181051 ||  || — || August 6, 2005 || Reedy Creek || J. Broughton || — || align=right | 3.2 km || 
|-id=052 bgcolor=#fefefe
| 181052 ||  || — || August 4, 2005 || Palomar || NEAT || NYS || align=right | 1.2 km || 
|-id=053 bgcolor=#E9E9E9
| 181053 ||  || — || August 4, 2005 || Palomar || NEAT || — || align=right | 1.4 km || 
|-id=054 bgcolor=#d6d6d6
| 181054 ||  || — || August 4, 2005 || Palomar || NEAT || — || align=right | 3.5 km || 
|-id=055 bgcolor=#d6d6d6
| 181055 ||  || — || August 4, 2005 || Palomar || NEAT || KOR || align=right | 2.6 km || 
|-id=056 bgcolor=#E9E9E9
| 181056 ||  || — || August 11, 2005 || Pla D'Arguines || R. Ferrando, M. Ferrando || HNS || align=right | 1.7 km || 
|-id=057 bgcolor=#d6d6d6
| 181057 ||  || — || August 9, 2005 || Socorro || LINEAR || — || align=right | 2.7 km || 
|-id=058 bgcolor=#fefefe
| 181058 ||  || — || August 6, 2005 || Palomar || NEAT || — || align=right | 2.5 km || 
|-id=059 bgcolor=#E9E9E9
| 181059 ||  || — || August 22, 2005 || Palomar || NEAT || — || align=right | 2.5 km || 
|-id=060 bgcolor=#fefefe
| 181060 ||  || — || August 22, 2005 || Palomar || NEAT || — || align=right | 1.4 km || 
|-id=061 bgcolor=#d6d6d6
| 181061 ||  || — || August 24, 2005 || Palomar || NEAT || — || align=right | 4.1 km || 
|-id=062 bgcolor=#fefefe
| 181062 ||  || — || August 24, 2005 || Palomar || NEAT || — || align=right | 1.3 km || 
|-id=063 bgcolor=#d6d6d6
| 181063 ||  || — || August 24, 2005 || Palomar || NEAT || URS || align=right | 4.7 km || 
|-id=064 bgcolor=#E9E9E9
| 181064 ||  || — || August 24, 2005 || Palomar || NEAT || — || align=right | 3.7 km || 
|-id=065 bgcolor=#d6d6d6
| 181065 ||  || — || August 24, 2005 || Palomar || NEAT || — || align=right | 4.5 km || 
|-id=066 bgcolor=#d6d6d6
| 181066 ||  || — || August 24, 2005 || Palomar || NEAT || — || align=right | 5.2 km || 
|-id=067 bgcolor=#d6d6d6
| 181067 ||  || — || August 25, 2005 || Palomar || NEAT || 7:4 || align=right | 5.2 km || 
|-id=068 bgcolor=#d6d6d6
| 181068 ||  || — || August 24, 2005 || Palomar || NEAT || — || align=right | 5.4 km || 
|-id=069 bgcolor=#d6d6d6
| 181069 ||  || — || August 25, 2005 || Palomar || NEAT || — || align=right | 5.6 km || 
|-id=070 bgcolor=#fefefe
| 181070 ||  || — || August 25, 2005 || Palomar || NEAT || NYS || align=right data-sort-value="0.92" | 920 m || 
|-id=071 bgcolor=#d6d6d6
| 181071 ||  || — || August 25, 2005 || Campo Imperatore || CINEOS || HYG || align=right | 3.9 km || 
|-id=072 bgcolor=#d6d6d6
| 181072 ||  || — || August 25, 2005 || Campo Imperatore || CINEOS || — || align=right | 6.3 km || 
|-id=073 bgcolor=#d6d6d6
| 181073 ||  || — || August 25, 2005 || Campo Imperatore || CINEOS || — || align=right | 3.0 km || 
|-id=074 bgcolor=#d6d6d6
| 181074 ||  || — || August 26, 2005 || Anderson Mesa || LONEOS || — || align=right | 4.1 km || 
|-id=075 bgcolor=#E9E9E9
| 181075 ||  || — || August 26, 2005 || Anderson Mesa || LONEOS || — || align=right | 3.4 km || 
|-id=076 bgcolor=#E9E9E9
| 181076 ||  || — || August 27, 2005 || Anderson Mesa || LONEOS || EUN || align=right | 2.1 km || 
|-id=077 bgcolor=#d6d6d6
| 181077 ||  || — || August 27, 2005 || Kitt Peak || Spacewatch || — || align=right | 4.1 km || 
|-id=078 bgcolor=#d6d6d6
| 181078 ||  || — || August 27, 2005 || Kitt Peak || Spacewatch || KOR || align=right | 1.8 km || 
|-id=079 bgcolor=#d6d6d6
| 181079 ||  || — || August 27, 2005 || Kitt Peak || Spacewatch || — || align=right | 4.1 km || 
|-id=080 bgcolor=#fefefe
| 181080 ||  || — || August 22, 2005 || Siding Spring || SSS || — || align=right | 2.1 km || 
|-id=081 bgcolor=#d6d6d6
| 181081 ||  || — || August 25, 2005 || Palomar || NEAT || — || align=right | 4.3 km || 
|-id=082 bgcolor=#d6d6d6
| 181082 ||  || — || August 25, 2005 || Palomar || NEAT || — || align=right | 3.4 km || 
|-id=083 bgcolor=#E9E9E9
| 181083 ||  || — || August 25, 2005 || Palomar || NEAT || — || align=right | 4.3 km || 
|-id=084 bgcolor=#E9E9E9
| 181084 ||  || — || August 25, 2005 || Campo Imperatore || CINEOS || GEF || align=right | 2.0 km || 
|-id=085 bgcolor=#d6d6d6
| 181085 ||  || — || August 26, 2005 || Anderson Mesa || LONEOS || — || align=right | 4.4 km || 
|-id=086 bgcolor=#d6d6d6
| 181086 ||  || — || August 26, 2005 || Palomar || NEAT || MEL || align=right | 6.3 km || 
|-id=087 bgcolor=#d6d6d6
| 181087 ||  || — || August 26, 2005 || Palomar || NEAT || — || align=right | 4.6 km || 
|-id=088 bgcolor=#d6d6d6
| 181088 ||  || — || August 26, 2005 || Palomar || NEAT || HYG || align=right | 4.9 km || 
|-id=089 bgcolor=#d6d6d6
| 181089 ||  || — || August 27, 2005 || Anderson Mesa || LONEOS || EOS || align=right | 3.5 km || 
|-id=090 bgcolor=#E9E9E9
| 181090 ||  || — || August 27, 2005 || Anderson Mesa || LONEOS || — || align=right | 2.6 km || 
|-id=091 bgcolor=#fefefe
| 181091 ||  || — || August 28, 2005 || Kitt Peak || Spacewatch || MAS || align=right | 1.1 km || 
|-id=092 bgcolor=#E9E9E9
| 181092 ||  || — || August 28, 2005 || Anderson Mesa || LONEOS || — || align=right | 2.5 km || 
|-id=093 bgcolor=#d6d6d6
| 181093 ||  || — || August 28, 2005 || Kitt Peak || Spacewatch || — || align=right | 4.2 km || 
|-id=094 bgcolor=#d6d6d6
| 181094 ||  || — || August 28, 2005 || Haleakala || NEAT || TEL || align=right | 2.3 km || 
|-id=095 bgcolor=#d6d6d6
| 181095 ||  || — || August 25, 2005 || Palomar || NEAT || — || align=right | 4.1 km || 
|-id=096 bgcolor=#d6d6d6
| 181096 ||  || — || August 26, 2005 || Palomar || NEAT || — || align=right | 4.7 km || 
|-id=097 bgcolor=#d6d6d6
| 181097 ||  || — || August 26, 2005 || Palomar || NEAT || KOR || align=right | 2.0 km || 
|-id=098 bgcolor=#d6d6d6
| 181098 ||  || — || August 26, 2005 || Anderson Mesa || LONEOS || — || align=right | 5.7 km || 
|-id=099 bgcolor=#d6d6d6
| 181099 ||  || — || August 27, 2005 || Anderson Mesa || LONEOS || — || align=right | 4.4 km || 
|-id=100 bgcolor=#fefefe
| 181100 ||  || — || August 29, 2005 || Socorro || LINEAR || MAS || align=right | 1.6 km || 
|}

181101–181200 

|-bgcolor=#fefefe
| 181101 ||  || — || August 29, 2005 || Socorro || LINEAR || NYS || align=right data-sort-value="0.98" | 980 m || 
|-id=102 bgcolor=#d6d6d6
| 181102 ||  || — || August 29, 2005 || Socorro || LINEAR || EOS || align=right | 3.8 km || 
|-id=103 bgcolor=#d6d6d6
| 181103 ||  || — || August 29, 2005 || Anderson Mesa || LONEOS || — || align=right | 3.7 km || 
|-id=104 bgcolor=#fefefe
| 181104 ||  || — || August 29, 2005 || Anderson Mesa || LONEOS || NYS || align=right | 1.0 km || 
|-id=105 bgcolor=#d6d6d6
| 181105 ||  || — || August 29, 2005 || Kitt Peak || Spacewatch || CHA || align=right | 3.4 km || 
|-id=106 bgcolor=#d6d6d6
| 181106 ||  || — || August 29, 2005 || Anderson Mesa || LONEOS || — || align=right | 4.2 km || 
|-id=107 bgcolor=#d6d6d6
| 181107 ||  || — || August 24, 2005 || Palomar || NEAT || EOS || align=right | 2.3 km || 
|-id=108 bgcolor=#d6d6d6
| 181108 ||  || — || August 28, 2005 || Saint-Véran || Saint-Véran Obs. || EOS || align=right | 3.1 km || 
|-id=109 bgcolor=#E9E9E9
| 181109 ||  || — || August 28, 2005 || Siding Spring || SSS || — || align=right | 3.4 km || 
|-id=110 bgcolor=#E9E9E9
| 181110 ||  || — || August 30, 2005 || Kitt Peak || Spacewatch || — || align=right | 2.1 km || 
|-id=111 bgcolor=#fefefe
| 181111 ||  || — || August 24, 2005 || Reedy Creek || J. Broughton || — || align=right | 2.1 km || 
|-id=112 bgcolor=#E9E9E9
| 181112 ||  || — || August 25, 2005 || Campo Imperatore || CINEOS || — || align=right | 5.6 km || 
|-id=113 bgcolor=#E9E9E9
| 181113 ||  || — || August 26, 2005 || Palomar || NEAT || PAD || align=right | 2.5 km || 
|-id=114 bgcolor=#d6d6d6
| 181114 ||  || — || August 26, 2005 || Palomar || NEAT || KOR || align=right | 2.0 km || 
|-id=115 bgcolor=#E9E9E9
| 181115 ||  || — || August 27, 2005 || Palomar || NEAT || — || align=right | 3.3 km || 
|-id=116 bgcolor=#E9E9E9
| 181116 ||  || — || August 27, 2005 || Palomar || NEAT || HOF || align=right | 3.6 km || 
|-id=117 bgcolor=#d6d6d6
| 181117 ||  || — || August 27, 2005 || Palomar || NEAT || — || align=right | 7.3 km || 
|-id=118 bgcolor=#d6d6d6
| 181118 ||  || — || August 27, 2005 || Palomar || NEAT || EOS || align=right | 2.2 km || 
|-id=119 bgcolor=#d6d6d6
| 181119 ||  || — || August 27, 2005 || Palomar || NEAT || — || align=right | 5.6 km || 
|-id=120 bgcolor=#d6d6d6
| 181120 ||  || — || August 27, 2005 || Palomar || NEAT || — || align=right | 4.5 km || 
|-id=121 bgcolor=#d6d6d6
| 181121 ||  || — || August 27, 2005 || Palomar || NEAT || — || align=right | 3.6 km || 
|-id=122 bgcolor=#E9E9E9
| 181122 ||  || — || August 27, 2005 || Palomar || NEAT || — || align=right | 3.6 km || 
|-id=123 bgcolor=#E9E9E9
| 181123 ||  || — || August 27, 2005 || Palomar || NEAT || AGN || align=right | 1.6 km || 
|-id=124 bgcolor=#d6d6d6
| 181124 ||  || — || August 27, 2005 || Palomar || NEAT || — || align=right | 3.7 km || 
|-id=125 bgcolor=#d6d6d6
| 181125 ||  || — || August 27, 2005 || Palomar || NEAT || — || align=right | 4.6 km || 
|-id=126 bgcolor=#fefefe
| 181126 ||  || — || August 27, 2005 || Palomar || NEAT || — || align=right | 3.1 km || 
|-id=127 bgcolor=#E9E9E9
| 181127 ||  || — || August 28, 2005 || Kitt Peak || Spacewatch || PAD || align=right | 3.7 km || 
|-id=128 bgcolor=#d6d6d6
| 181128 ||  || — || August 28, 2005 || Kitt Peak || Spacewatch || THM || align=right | 2.9 km || 
|-id=129 bgcolor=#E9E9E9
| 181129 ||  || — || August 28, 2005 || Kitt Peak || Spacewatch || MRX || align=right | 1.6 km || 
|-id=130 bgcolor=#d6d6d6
| 181130 ||  || — || August 28, 2005 || Kitt Peak || Spacewatch || — || align=right | 2.8 km || 
|-id=131 bgcolor=#d6d6d6
| 181131 ||  || — || August 28, 2005 || Kitt Peak || Spacewatch || — || align=right | 3.3 km || 
|-id=132 bgcolor=#d6d6d6
| 181132 ||  || — || August 29, 2005 || Anderson Mesa || LONEOS || — || align=right | 3.0 km || 
|-id=133 bgcolor=#d6d6d6
| 181133 ||  || — || August 30, 2005 || Socorro || LINEAR || — || align=right | 6.0 km || 
|-id=134 bgcolor=#E9E9E9
| 181134 ||  || — || August 28, 2005 || Siding Spring || SSS || GEF || align=right | 2.1 km || 
|-id=135 bgcolor=#E9E9E9
| 181135 ||  || — || August 30, 2005 || Kitt Peak || Spacewatch || — || align=right | 2.2 km || 
|-id=136 bgcolor=#d6d6d6
| 181136 Losonczrita ||  ||  || August 25, 2005 || Piszkéstető || Piszkéstető Stn. || — || align=right | 3.9 km || 
|-id=137 bgcolor=#E9E9E9
| 181137 ||  || — || August 30, 2005 || Palomar || NEAT || — || align=right | 3.7 km || 
|-id=138 bgcolor=#d6d6d6
| 181138 ||  || — || August 30, 2005 || Palomar || NEAT || — || align=right | 5.6 km || 
|-id=139 bgcolor=#E9E9E9
| 181139 ||  || — || August 26, 2005 || Palomar || NEAT || — || align=right | 3.2 km || 
|-id=140 bgcolor=#d6d6d6
| 181140 ||  || — || August 31, 2005 || Palomar || NEAT || — || align=right | 6.1 km || 
|-id=141 bgcolor=#d6d6d6
| 181141 ||  || — || August 29, 2005 || Palomar || NEAT || — || align=right | 3.4 km || 
|-id=142 bgcolor=#E9E9E9
| 181142 ||  || — || August 31, 2005 || Kitt Peak || Spacewatch || — || align=right | 3.4 km || 
|-id=143 bgcolor=#d6d6d6
| 181143 ||  || — || August 31, 2005 || Kitt Peak || Spacewatch || SYL7:4 || align=right | 6.9 km || 
|-id=144 bgcolor=#d6d6d6
| 181144 ||  || — || August 27, 2005 || Kitt Peak || Spacewatch || K-2 || align=right | 2.3 km || 
|-id=145 bgcolor=#d6d6d6
| 181145 ||  || — || August 24, 2005 || Palomar || NEAT || — || align=right | 3.6 km || 
|-id=146 bgcolor=#E9E9E9
| 181146 ||  || — || August 31, 2005 || Kitt Peak || Spacewatch || — || align=right | 2.9 km || 
|-id=147 bgcolor=#d6d6d6
| 181147 ||  || — || September 4, 2005 || Marly || Naef Obs. || EOS || align=right | 3.1 km || 
|-id=148 bgcolor=#d6d6d6
| 181148 ||  || — || September 3, 2005 || Palomar || NEAT || — || align=right | 4.1 km || 
|-id=149 bgcolor=#d6d6d6
| 181149 ||  || — || September 5, 2005 || Haleakala || NEAT || — || align=right | 4.0 km || 
|-id=150 bgcolor=#d6d6d6
| 181150 ||  || — || September 6, 2005 || Anderson Mesa || LONEOS || — || align=right | 6.7 km || 
|-id=151 bgcolor=#d6d6d6
| 181151 ||  || — || September 8, 2005 || Socorro || LINEAR || THM || align=right | 3.8 km || 
|-id=152 bgcolor=#d6d6d6
| 181152 ||  || — || September 1, 2005 || Kitt Peak || Spacewatch || — || align=right | 3.4 km || 
|-id=153 bgcolor=#d6d6d6
| 181153 ||  || — || September 10, 2005 || Anderson Mesa || LONEOS || — || align=right | 4.0 km || 
|-id=154 bgcolor=#d6d6d6
| 181154 ||  || — || September 6, 2005 || Anderson Mesa || LONEOS || KOR || align=right | 2.7 km || 
|-id=155 bgcolor=#d6d6d6
| 181155 ||  || — || September 11, 2005 || Kitt Peak || Spacewatch || — || align=right | 3.9 km || 
|-id=156 bgcolor=#d6d6d6
| 181156 ||  || — || September 13, 2005 || Anderson Mesa || LONEOS || — || align=right | 3.9 km || 
|-id=157 bgcolor=#d6d6d6
| 181157 ||  || — || September 14, 2005 || Catalina || CSS || ALA || align=right | 5.7 km || 
|-id=158 bgcolor=#d6d6d6
| 181158 ||  || — || September 13, 2005 || Kitt Peak || Spacewatch || EOS || align=right | 2.7 km || 
|-id=159 bgcolor=#d6d6d6
| 181159 ||  || — || September 13, 2005 || Apache Point || A. C. Becker || — || align=right | 3.0 km || 
|-id=160 bgcolor=#d6d6d6
| 181160 ||  || — || September 23, 2005 || Catalina || CSS || VER || align=right | 5.0 km || 
|-id=161 bgcolor=#E9E9E9
| 181161 ||  || — || September 23, 2005 || Kitt Peak || Spacewatch || — || align=right | 3.4 km || 
|-id=162 bgcolor=#d6d6d6
| 181162 ||  || — || September 23, 2005 || Kitt Peak || Spacewatch || THM || align=right | 4.6 km || 
|-id=163 bgcolor=#d6d6d6
| 181163 ||  || — || September 24, 2005 || Kitt Peak || Spacewatch || EOS || align=right | 2.9 km || 
|-id=164 bgcolor=#d6d6d6
| 181164 ||  || — || September 26, 2005 || Kitt Peak || Spacewatch || HYG || align=right | 4.1 km || 
|-id=165 bgcolor=#E9E9E9
| 181165 ||  || — || September 23, 2005 || Kitt Peak || Spacewatch || — || align=right | 5.1 km || 
|-id=166 bgcolor=#E9E9E9
| 181166 ||  || — || September 24, 2005 || Anderson Mesa || LONEOS || — || align=right | 2.4 km || 
|-id=167 bgcolor=#E9E9E9
| 181167 ||  || — || September 23, 2005 || Anderson Mesa || LONEOS || — || align=right | 3.9 km || 
|-id=168 bgcolor=#d6d6d6
| 181168 ||  || — || September 24, 2005 || Kitt Peak || Spacewatch || — || align=right | 3.0 km || 
|-id=169 bgcolor=#d6d6d6
| 181169 ||  || — || September 25, 2005 || Kitt Peak || Spacewatch || HYG || align=right | 3.3 km || 
|-id=170 bgcolor=#d6d6d6
| 181170 ||  || — || September 26, 2005 || Kitt Peak || Spacewatch || KOR || align=right | 2.0 km || 
|-id=171 bgcolor=#d6d6d6
| 181171 ||  || — || September 26, 2005 || Palomar || NEAT || KOR || align=right | 2.2 km || 
|-id=172 bgcolor=#d6d6d6
| 181172 ||  || — || September 27, 2005 || Kitt Peak || Spacewatch || ALA || align=right | 7.2 km || 
|-id=173 bgcolor=#d6d6d6
| 181173 ||  || — || September 27, 2005 || Kitt Peak || Spacewatch || — || align=right | 3.4 km || 
|-id=174 bgcolor=#d6d6d6
| 181174 ||  || — || September 27, 2005 || Junk Bond || D. Healy || VER || align=right | 4.9 km || 
|-id=175 bgcolor=#d6d6d6
| 181175 ||  || — || September 23, 2005 || Catalina || CSS || 7:4 || align=right | 4.8 km || 
|-id=176 bgcolor=#d6d6d6
| 181176 ||  || — || September 23, 2005 || Kitt Peak || Spacewatch || — || align=right | 5.4 km || 
|-id=177 bgcolor=#d6d6d6
| 181177 ||  || — || September 23, 2005 || Catalina || CSS || 7:4 || align=right | 8.3 km || 
|-id=178 bgcolor=#d6d6d6
| 181178 ||  || — || September 24, 2005 || Kitt Peak || Spacewatch || — || align=right | 3.2 km || 
|-id=179 bgcolor=#E9E9E9
| 181179 ||  || — || September 24, 2005 || Kitt Peak || Spacewatch || — || align=right | 3.1 km || 
|-id=180 bgcolor=#d6d6d6
| 181180 ||  || — || September 24, 2005 || Kitt Peak || Spacewatch || — || align=right | 5.4 km || 
|-id=181 bgcolor=#d6d6d6
| 181181 ||  || — || September 24, 2005 || Kitt Peak || Spacewatch || — || align=right | 6.0 km || 
|-id=182 bgcolor=#d6d6d6
| 181182 ||  || — || September 24, 2005 || Kitt Peak || Spacewatch || KOR || align=right | 1.9 km || 
|-id=183 bgcolor=#d6d6d6
| 181183 ||  || — || September 24, 2005 || Kitt Peak || Spacewatch || — || align=right | 3.6 km || 
|-id=184 bgcolor=#d6d6d6
| 181184 ||  || — || September 25, 2005 || Kitt Peak || Spacewatch || EOS || align=right | 3.8 km || 
|-id=185 bgcolor=#d6d6d6
| 181185 ||  || — || September 25, 2005 || Kitt Peak || Spacewatch || — || align=right | 3.6 km || 
|-id=186 bgcolor=#d6d6d6
| 181186 ||  || — || September 25, 2005 || Kitt Peak || Spacewatch || — || align=right | 4.2 km || 
|-id=187 bgcolor=#d6d6d6
| 181187 ||  || — || September 25, 2005 || Kitt Peak || Spacewatch || — || align=right | 4.0 km || 
|-id=188 bgcolor=#d6d6d6
| 181188 ||  || — || September 26, 2005 || Kitt Peak || Spacewatch || KOR || align=right | 2.0 km || 
|-id=189 bgcolor=#d6d6d6
| 181189 ||  || — || September 27, 2005 || Kitt Peak || Spacewatch || CHA || align=right | 3.8 km || 
|-id=190 bgcolor=#d6d6d6
| 181190 ||  || — || September 27, 2005 || Kitt Peak || Spacewatch || — || align=right | 4.5 km || 
|-id=191 bgcolor=#d6d6d6
| 181191 ||  || — || September 29, 2005 || Kitt Peak || Spacewatch || — || align=right | 5.0 km || 
|-id=192 bgcolor=#E9E9E9
| 181192 ||  || — || September 29, 2005 || Anderson Mesa || LONEOS || PAD || align=right | 2.6 km || 
|-id=193 bgcolor=#E9E9E9
| 181193 ||  || — || September 29, 2005 || Kitt Peak || Spacewatch || — || align=right | 1.8 km || 
|-id=194 bgcolor=#d6d6d6
| 181194 ||  || — || September 29, 2005 || Mount Lemmon || Mount Lemmon Survey || — || align=right | 3.6 km || 
|-id=195 bgcolor=#d6d6d6
| 181195 ||  || — || September 29, 2005 || Kitt Peak || Spacewatch || — || align=right | 4.7 km || 
|-id=196 bgcolor=#d6d6d6
| 181196 ||  || — || September 24, 2005 || Kitt Peak || Spacewatch || — || align=right | 4.6 km || 
|-id=197 bgcolor=#E9E9E9
| 181197 ||  || — || September 25, 2005 || Kitt Peak || Spacewatch || — || align=right | 2.7 km || 
|-id=198 bgcolor=#d6d6d6
| 181198 ||  || — || September 25, 2005 || Kitt Peak || Spacewatch || KOR || align=right | 2.2 km || 
|-id=199 bgcolor=#E9E9E9
| 181199 ||  || — || September 25, 2005 || Kitt Peak || Spacewatch || — || align=right | 3.2 km || 
|-id=200 bgcolor=#d6d6d6
| 181200 ||  || — || September 26, 2005 || Socorro || LINEAR || — || align=right | 5.6 km || 
|}

181201–181300 

|-bgcolor=#E9E9E9
| 181201 ||  || — || September 27, 2005 || Kitt Peak || Spacewatch || — || align=right | 2.1 km || 
|-id=202 bgcolor=#d6d6d6
| 181202 ||  || — || September 27, 2005 || Kitt Peak || Spacewatch || KOR || align=right | 1.9 km || 
|-id=203 bgcolor=#E9E9E9
| 181203 ||  || — || September 28, 2005 || Palomar || NEAT || ADE || align=right | 3.3 km || 
|-id=204 bgcolor=#E9E9E9
| 181204 ||  || — || September 29, 2005 || Kitt Peak || Spacewatch || MRX || align=right | 1.9 km || 
|-id=205 bgcolor=#d6d6d6
| 181205 ||  || — || September 29, 2005 || Kitt Peak || Spacewatch || — || align=right | 5.4 km || 
|-id=206 bgcolor=#d6d6d6
| 181206 ||  || — || September 29, 2005 || Kitt Peak || Spacewatch || — || align=right | 3.1 km || 
|-id=207 bgcolor=#d6d6d6
| 181207 ||  || — || September 29, 2005 || Anderson Mesa || LONEOS || KOR || align=right | 2.5 km || 
|-id=208 bgcolor=#d6d6d6
| 181208 ||  || — || September 29, 2005 || Anderson Mesa || LONEOS || — || align=right | 3.2 km || 
|-id=209 bgcolor=#d6d6d6
| 181209 ||  || — || September 29, 2005 || Kitt Peak || Spacewatch || — || align=right | 4.0 km || 
|-id=210 bgcolor=#d6d6d6
| 181210 ||  || — || September 29, 2005 || Kitt Peak || Spacewatch || — || align=right | 3.5 km || 
|-id=211 bgcolor=#d6d6d6
| 181211 ||  || — || September 29, 2005 || Anderson Mesa || LONEOS || — || align=right | 4.1 km || 
|-id=212 bgcolor=#d6d6d6
| 181212 ||  || — || September 29, 2005 || Anderson Mesa || LONEOS || HYG || align=right | 5.5 km || 
|-id=213 bgcolor=#E9E9E9
| 181213 ||  || — || September 29, 2005 || Mount Lemmon || Mount Lemmon Survey || XIZ || align=right | 2.6 km || 
|-id=214 bgcolor=#d6d6d6
| 181214 ||  || — || September 30, 2005 || Mount Lemmon || Mount Lemmon Survey || — || align=right | 4.0 km || 
|-id=215 bgcolor=#d6d6d6
| 181215 ||  || — || September 30, 2005 || Mount Lemmon || Mount Lemmon Survey || — || align=right | 3.8 km || 
|-id=216 bgcolor=#d6d6d6
| 181216 ||  || — || September 24, 2005 || Palomar || NEAT || — || align=right | 4.7 km || 
|-id=217 bgcolor=#E9E9E9
| 181217 ||  || — || September 22, 2005 || Palomar || NEAT || — || align=right | 2.7 km || 
|-id=218 bgcolor=#d6d6d6
| 181218 ||  || — || September 22, 2005 || Palomar || NEAT || — || align=right | 4.2 km || 
|-id=219 bgcolor=#d6d6d6
| 181219 ||  || — || September 24, 2005 || Anderson Mesa || LONEOS || TIR || align=right | 4.0 km || 
|-id=220 bgcolor=#d6d6d6
| 181220 ||  || — || September 23, 2005 || Kitt Peak || Spacewatch || KOR || align=right | 2.3 km || 
|-id=221 bgcolor=#d6d6d6
| 181221 ||  || — || September 30, 2005 || Anderson Mesa || LONEOS || — || align=right | 5.5 km || 
|-id=222 bgcolor=#d6d6d6
| 181222 ||  || — || October 1, 2005 || Socorro || LINEAR || — || align=right | 5.9 km || 
|-id=223 bgcolor=#d6d6d6
| 181223 ||  || — || October 1, 2005 || Catalina || CSS || — || align=right | 3.5 km || 
|-id=224 bgcolor=#d6d6d6
| 181224 ||  || — || October 1, 2005 || Anderson Mesa || LONEOS || — || align=right | 3.3 km || 
|-id=225 bgcolor=#E9E9E9
| 181225 ||  || — || October 3, 2005 || Kitt Peak || Spacewatch || — || align=right | 2.3 km || 
|-id=226 bgcolor=#d6d6d6
| 181226 ||  || — || October 1, 2005 || Kitt Peak || Spacewatch || 7:4 || align=right | 5.4 km || 
|-id=227 bgcolor=#d6d6d6
| 181227 ||  || — || October 1, 2005 || Mount Lemmon || Mount Lemmon Survey || — || align=right | 3.2 km || 
|-id=228 bgcolor=#d6d6d6
| 181228 ||  || — || October 9, 2005 || Ottmarsheim || Ottmarsheim Obs. || — || align=right | 5.0 km || 
|-id=229 bgcolor=#E9E9E9
| 181229 ||  || — || October 2, 2005 || Mount Lemmon || Mount Lemmon Survey || — || align=right | 3.5 km || 
|-id=230 bgcolor=#E9E9E9
| 181230 ||  || — || October 1, 2005 || Kitt Peak || Spacewatch || AGN || align=right | 1.4 km || 
|-id=231 bgcolor=#d6d6d6
| 181231 ||  || — || October 3, 2005 || Socorro || LINEAR || SYL7:4 || align=right | 8.1 km || 
|-id=232 bgcolor=#d6d6d6
| 181232 ||  || — || October 6, 2005 || Mount Lemmon || Mount Lemmon Survey || ANF || align=right | 2.5 km || 
|-id=233 bgcolor=#d6d6d6
| 181233 ||  || — || October 7, 2005 || Catalina || CSS || KOR || align=right | 2.5 km || 
|-id=234 bgcolor=#d6d6d6
| 181234 ||  || — || October 7, 2005 || Kitt Peak || Spacewatch || VER || align=right | 5.9 km || 
|-id=235 bgcolor=#d6d6d6
| 181235 ||  || — || October 7, 2005 || Kitt Peak || Spacewatch || — || align=right | 4.2 km || 
|-id=236 bgcolor=#d6d6d6
| 181236 ||  || — || October 6, 2005 || Kitt Peak || Spacewatch || — || align=right | 4.3 km || 
|-id=237 bgcolor=#d6d6d6
| 181237 ||  || — || October 8, 2005 || Socorro || LINEAR || — || align=right | 4.8 km || 
|-id=238 bgcolor=#d6d6d6
| 181238 ||  || — || October 1, 2005 || Kitt Peak || Spacewatch || — || align=right | 3.2 km || 
|-id=239 bgcolor=#d6d6d6
| 181239 ||  || — || October 1, 2005 || Kitt Peak || Spacewatch || — || align=right | 4.0 km || 
|-id=240 bgcolor=#E9E9E9
| 181240 ||  || — || October 26, 2005 || Socorro || LINEAR || — || align=right | 2.6 km || 
|-id=241 bgcolor=#d6d6d6
| 181241 Dipasquale ||  ||  || October 28, 2005 || Vallemare di Borbona Obs. || V. S. Casulli || VER || align=right | 4.4 km || 
|-id=242 bgcolor=#d6d6d6
| 181242 ||  || — || October 23, 2005 || Kitt Peak || Spacewatch || 628 || align=right | 4.8 km || 
|-id=243 bgcolor=#E9E9E9
| 181243 ||  || — || October 22, 2005 || Palomar || NEAT || MRX || align=right | 2.1 km || 
|-id=244 bgcolor=#d6d6d6
| 181244 ||  || — || October 22, 2005 || Palomar || NEAT || URS || align=right | 5.8 km || 
|-id=245 bgcolor=#d6d6d6
| 181245 ||  || — || October 22, 2005 || Anderson Mesa || LONEOS || — || align=right | 6.0 km || 
|-id=246 bgcolor=#E9E9E9
| 181246 ||  || — || October 22, 2005 || Palomar || NEAT || — || align=right | 3.6 km || 
|-id=247 bgcolor=#d6d6d6
| 181247 ||  || — || October 22, 2005 || Palomar || NEAT || — || align=right | 5.7 km || 
|-id=248 bgcolor=#d6d6d6
| 181248 ||  || — || October 26, 2005 || Kitt Peak || Spacewatch || 7:4 || align=right | 6.7 km || 
|-id=249 bgcolor=#d6d6d6
| 181249 Tkachenko ||  ||  || October 30, 2005 || Andrushivka || Andrushivka Obs. || fast? || align=right | 3.5 km || 
|-id=250 bgcolor=#d6d6d6
| 181250 ||  || — || October 24, 2005 || Kitt Peak || Spacewatch || — || align=right | 3.3 km || 
|-id=251 bgcolor=#d6d6d6
| 181251 ||  || — || October 25, 2005 || Anderson Mesa || LONEOS || HYG || align=right | 4.4 km || 
|-id=252 bgcolor=#d6d6d6
| 181252 ||  || — || October 24, 2005 || Kitt Peak || Spacewatch || THM || align=right | 3.2 km || 
|-id=253 bgcolor=#E9E9E9
| 181253 ||  || — || October 26, 2005 || Kitt Peak || Spacewatch || — || align=right | 1.8 km || 
|-id=254 bgcolor=#d6d6d6
| 181254 ||  || — || October 26, 2005 || Kitt Peak || Spacewatch || 3:2 || align=right | 5.5 km || 
|-id=255 bgcolor=#d6d6d6
| 181255 ||  || — || October 27, 2005 || Palomar || NEAT || — || align=right | 3.2 km || 
|-id=256 bgcolor=#d6d6d6
| 181256 ||  || — || October 25, 2005 || Kitt Peak || Spacewatch || SHU3:2 || align=right | 12 km || 
|-id=257 bgcolor=#d6d6d6
| 181257 ||  || — || October 27, 2005 || Kitt Peak || Spacewatch || — || align=right | 3.1 km || 
|-id=258 bgcolor=#E9E9E9
| 181258 ||  || — || November 1, 2005 || Kitt Peak || Spacewatch || — || align=right | 4.3 km || 
|-id=259 bgcolor=#d6d6d6
| 181259 ||  || — || November 1, 2005 || Kitt Peak || Spacewatch || THM || align=right | 3.5 km || 
|-id=260 bgcolor=#E9E9E9
| 181260 ||  || — || November 3, 2005 || Kitt Peak || Spacewatch || — || align=right | 3.3 km || 
|-id=261 bgcolor=#E9E9E9
| 181261 ||  || — || November 4, 2005 || Catalina || CSS || — || align=right | 3.4 km || 
|-id=262 bgcolor=#d6d6d6
| 181262 ||  || — || November 4, 2005 || Catalina || CSS || EOS || align=right | 3.8 km || 
|-id=263 bgcolor=#d6d6d6
| 181263 ||  || — || November 10, 2005 || Kitt Peak || Spacewatch || HYG || align=right | 4.7 km || 
|-id=264 bgcolor=#d6d6d6
| 181264 ||  || — || November 10, 2005 || Catalina || CSS || HYG || align=right | 4.8 km || 
|-id=265 bgcolor=#d6d6d6
| 181265 ||  || — || November 1, 2005 || Apache Point || A. C. Becker || VER || align=right | 3.3 km || 
|-id=266 bgcolor=#d6d6d6
| 181266 ||  || — || November 21, 2005 || Anderson Mesa || LONEOS || — || align=right | 3.9 km || 
|-id=267 bgcolor=#d6d6d6
| 181267 ||  || — || November 22, 2005 || Kitt Peak || Spacewatch || THM || align=right | 3.0 km || 
|-id=268 bgcolor=#d6d6d6
| 181268 ||  || — || November 22, 2005 || Kitt Peak || Spacewatch || — || align=right | 4.8 km || 
|-id=269 bgcolor=#d6d6d6
| 181269 ||  || — || November 28, 2005 || Catalina || CSS || — || align=right | 6.6 km || 
|-id=270 bgcolor=#d6d6d6
| 181270 ||  || — || November 25, 2005 || Mount Lemmon || Mount Lemmon Survey || — || align=right | 3.6 km || 
|-id=271 bgcolor=#d6d6d6
| 181271 ||  || — || November 29, 2005 || Mount Lemmon || Mount Lemmon Survey || — || align=right | 4.3 km || 
|-id=272 bgcolor=#d6d6d6
| 181272 ||  || — || November 29, 2005 || Palomar || NEAT || — || align=right | 6.2 km || 
|-id=273 bgcolor=#d6d6d6
| 181273 ||  || — || December 1, 2005 || Mount Lemmon || Mount Lemmon Survey || KOR || align=right | 1.9 km || 
|-id=274 bgcolor=#d6d6d6
| 181274 ||  || — || December 5, 2005 || Pla D'Arguines || Pla D'Arguines Obs. || — || align=right | 3.4 km || 
|-id=275 bgcolor=#d6d6d6
| 181275 ||  || — || December 1, 2005 || Kitt Peak || Spacewatch || SHU3:2 || align=right | 6.8 km || 
|-id=276 bgcolor=#d6d6d6
| 181276 ||  || — || December 1, 2005 || Catalina || CSS || — || align=right | 4.4 km || 
|-id=277 bgcolor=#d6d6d6
| 181277 ||  || — || December 21, 2005 || Kitt Peak || Spacewatch || — || align=right | 4.9 km || 
|-id=278 bgcolor=#C2FFFF
| 181278 ||  || — || December 22, 2005 || Kitt Peak || Spacewatch || L5 || align=right | 11 km || 
|-id=279 bgcolor=#C2FFFF
| 181279 Iapyx ||  ||  || January 22, 2006 || Tenagra II || J.-C. Merlin || L5 || align=right | 14 km || 
|-id=280 bgcolor=#E9E9E9
| 181280 ||  || — || March 2, 2006 || Kitt Peak || Spacewatch || MAR || align=right | 1.4 km || 
|-id=281 bgcolor=#fefefe
| 181281 ||  || — || May 25, 2006 || Mount Lemmon || Mount Lemmon Survey || — || align=right data-sort-value="0.87" | 870 m || 
|-id=282 bgcolor=#fefefe
| 181282 ||  || — || May 25, 2006 || Kitt Peak || Spacewatch || — || align=right | 1.4 km || 
|-id=283 bgcolor=#fefefe
| 181283 ||  || — || July 19, 2006 || Palomar || NEAT || — || align=right | 1.4 km || 
|-id=284 bgcolor=#fefefe
| 181284 ||  || — || July 21, 2006 || Mount Lemmon || Mount Lemmon Survey || — || align=right data-sort-value="0.92" | 920 m || 
|-id=285 bgcolor=#d6d6d6
| 181285 ||  || — || July 21, 2006 || Mount Lemmon || Mount Lemmon Survey || — || align=right | 3.6 km || 
|-id=286 bgcolor=#d6d6d6
| 181286 ||  || — || July 21, 2006 || Mount Lemmon || Mount Lemmon Survey || — || align=right | 3.2 km || 
|-id=287 bgcolor=#E9E9E9
| 181287 ||  || — || July 24, 2006 || Socorro || LINEAR || — || align=right | 4.7 km || 
|-id=288 bgcolor=#fefefe
| 181288 ||  || — || July 20, 2006 || Reedy Creek || J. Broughton || — || align=right | 2.1 km || 
|-id=289 bgcolor=#fefefe
| 181289 ||  || — || July 21, 2006 || Mount Lemmon || Mount Lemmon Survey || — || align=right | 1.2 km || 
|-id=290 bgcolor=#E9E9E9
| 181290 ||  || — || July 21, 2006 || Mount Lemmon || Mount Lemmon Survey || — || align=right | 2.7 km || 
|-id=291 bgcolor=#d6d6d6
| 181291 ||  || — || August 11, 2006 || Palomar || NEAT || — || align=right | 8.2 km || 
|-id=292 bgcolor=#fefefe
| 181292 ||  || — || August 13, 2006 || Palomar || NEAT || NYS || align=right | 1.1 km || 
|-id=293 bgcolor=#fefefe
| 181293 ||  || — || August 13, 2006 || Palomar || NEAT || NYS || align=right | 1.1 km || 
|-id=294 bgcolor=#fefefe
| 181294 ||  || — || August 13, 2006 || Palomar || NEAT || — || align=right | 1.3 km || 
|-id=295 bgcolor=#fefefe
| 181295 ||  || — || August 15, 2006 || Palomar || NEAT || FLO || align=right data-sort-value="0.98" | 980 m || 
|-id=296 bgcolor=#E9E9E9
| 181296 ||  || — || August 12, 2006 || Palomar || NEAT || — || align=right | 3.1 km || 
|-id=297 bgcolor=#fefefe
| 181297 ||  || — || August 15, 2006 || Palomar || NEAT || — || align=right data-sort-value="0.90" | 900 m || 
|-id=298 bgcolor=#d6d6d6
| 181298 Ladányi || 2006 QY ||  || August 17, 2006 || Piszkéstető || K. Sárneczky || — || align=right | 4.8 km || 
|-id=299 bgcolor=#fefefe
| 181299 ||  || — || August 17, 2006 || Palomar || NEAT || FLO || align=right data-sort-value="0.93" | 930 m || 
|-id=300 bgcolor=#E9E9E9
| 181300 ||  || — || August 19, 2006 || Kitt Peak || Spacewatch || — || align=right | 2.1 km || 
|}

181301–181400 

|-bgcolor=#E9E9E9
| 181301 ||  || — || August 19, 2006 || Kitt Peak || Spacewatch || — || align=right | 2.0 km || 
|-id=302 bgcolor=#E9E9E9
| 181302 ||  || — || August 17, 2006 || Socorro || LINEAR || JUN || align=right | 2.2 km || 
|-id=303 bgcolor=#fefefe
| 181303 ||  || — || August 18, 2006 || Anderson Mesa || LONEOS || NYS || align=right data-sort-value="0.87" | 870 m || 
|-id=304 bgcolor=#E9E9E9
| 181304 ||  || — || August 17, 2006 || Palomar || NEAT || — || align=right | 2.9 km || 
|-id=305 bgcolor=#fefefe
| 181305 ||  || — || August 17, 2006 || Palomar || NEAT || FLO || align=right | 1.0 km || 
|-id=306 bgcolor=#fefefe
| 181306 ||  || — || August 18, 2006 || Socorro || LINEAR || — || align=right | 1.3 km || 
|-id=307 bgcolor=#fefefe
| 181307 ||  || — || August 19, 2006 || Anderson Mesa || LONEOS || NYS || align=right | 1.0 km || 
|-id=308 bgcolor=#d6d6d6
| 181308 ||  || — || August 19, 2006 || Anderson Mesa || LONEOS || — || align=right | 3.9 km || 
|-id=309 bgcolor=#E9E9E9
| 181309 ||  || — || August 22, 2006 || Palomar || NEAT || JUN || align=right | 1.7 km || 
|-id=310 bgcolor=#fefefe
| 181310 ||  || — || August 17, 2006 || Palomar || NEAT || — || align=right | 1.4 km || 
|-id=311 bgcolor=#d6d6d6
| 181311 ||  || — || August 17, 2006 || Palomar || NEAT || — || align=right | 4.9 km || 
|-id=312 bgcolor=#fefefe
| 181312 ||  || — || August 24, 2006 || San Marcello || A. Boattini, L. Tesi || — || align=right data-sort-value="0.98" | 980 m || 
|-id=313 bgcolor=#fefefe
| 181313 ||  || — || August 19, 2006 || Kitt Peak || Spacewatch || NYS || align=right data-sort-value="0.99" | 990 m || 
|-id=314 bgcolor=#fefefe
| 181314 ||  || — || August 20, 2006 || Kitt Peak || Spacewatch || — || align=right | 1.2 km || 
|-id=315 bgcolor=#fefefe
| 181315 ||  || — || August 21, 2006 || Socorro || LINEAR || — || align=right | 1.1 km || 
|-id=316 bgcolor=#fefefe
| 181316 ||  || — || August 21, 2006 || Kitt Peak || Spacewatch || — || align=right | 1.1 km || 
|-id=317 bgcolor=#fefefe
| 181317 ||  || — || August 22, 2006 || Palomar || NEAT || — || align=right | 1.1 km || 
|-id=318 bgcolor=#fefefe
| 181318 ||  || — || August 24, 2006 || Socorro || LINEAR || — || align=right | 1.6 km || 
|-id=319 bgcolor=#E9E9E9
| 181319 ||  || — || August 24, 2006 || Socorro || LINEAR || EUN || align=right | 2.1 km || 
|-id=320 bgcolor=#fefefe
| 181320 ||  || — || August 27, 2006 || Anderson Mesa || LONEOS || H || align=right data-sort-value="0.98" | 980 m || 
|-id=321 bgcolor=#fefefe
| 181321 ||  || — || August 23, 2006 || Socorro || LINEAR || FLO || align=right | 1.1 km || 
|-id=322 bgcolor=#fefefe
| 181322 ||  || — || August 21, 2006 || Kitt Peak || Spacewatch || — || align=right | 1.1 km || 
|-id=323 bgcolor=#fefefe
| 181323 ||  || — || August 24, 2006 || Palomar || NEAT || — || align=right | 1.1 km || 
|-id=324 bgcolor=#fefefe
| 181324 ||  || — || August 24, 2006 || Palomar || NEAT || NYS || align=right data-sort-value="0.80" | 800 m || 
|-id=325 bgcolor=#E9E9E9
| 181325 ||  || — || August 27, 2006 || Kitt Peak || Spacewatch || — || align=right | 1.4 km || 
|-id=326 bgcolor=#fefefe
| 181326 ||  || — || August 22, 2006 || Palomar || NEAT || H || align=right data-sort-value="0.98" | 980 m || 
|-id=327 bgcolor=#fefefe
| 181327 ||  || — || August 16, 2006 || Palomar || NEAT || FLO || align=right data-sort-value="0.97" | 970 m || 
|-id=328 bgcolor=#fefefe
| 181328 ||  || — || August 16, 2006 || Palomar || NEAT || — || align=right | 1.2 km || 
|-id=329 bgcolor=#E9E9E9
| 181329 ||  || — || August 22, 2006 || Palomar || NEAT || — || align=right | 4.1 km || 
|-id=330 bgcolor=#d6d6d6
| 181330 ||  || — || August 28, 2006 || Kitt Peak || Spacewatch || — || align=right | 3.1 km || 
|-id=331 bgcolor=#fefefe
| 181331 ||  || — || August 23, 2006 || Palomar || NEAT || H || align=right data-sort-value="0.74" | 740 m || 
|-id=332 bgcolor=#fefefe
| 181332 ||  || — || August 23, 2006 || Palomar || NEAT || FLO || align=right | 1.1 km || 
|-id=333 bgcolor=#fefefe
| 181333 ||  || — || August 25, 2006 || Socorro || LINEAR || — || align=right | 1.1 km || 
|-id=334 bgcolor=#E9E9E9
| 181334 ||  || — || August 28, 2006 || Catalina || CSS || AEO || align=right | 3.1 km || 
|-id=335 bgcolor=#E9E9E9
| 181335 ||  || — || August 29, 2006 || Catalina || CSS || ADE || align=right | 3.5 km || 
|-id=336 bgcolor=#E9E9E9
| 181336 ||  || — || August 16, 2006 || Palomar || NEAT || — || align=right | 2.1 km || 
|-id=337 bgcolor=#fefefe
| 181337 ||  || — || August 16, 2006 || Palomar || NEAT || — || align=right | 1.1 km || 
|-id=338 bgcolor=#fefefe
| 181338 ||  || — || August 18, 2006 || Kitt Peak || Spacewatch || NYS || align=right data-sort-value="0.81" | 810 m || 
|-id=339 bgcolor=#fefefe
| 181339 ||  || — || August 19, 2006 || Kitt Peak || Spacewatch || — || align=right | 1.1 km || 
|-id=340 bgcolor=#fefefe
| 181340 ||  || — || August 19, 2006 || Kitt Peak || Spacewatch || NYS || align=right data-sort-value="0.74" | 740 m || 
|-id=341 bgcolor=#fefefe
| 181341 ||  || — || September 12, 2006 || Catalina || CSS || NYS || align=right data-sort-value="0.94" | 940 m || 
|-id=342 bgcolor=#fefefe
| 181342 ||  || — || September 14, 2006 || Catalina || CSS || — || align=right | 1.4 km || 
|-id=343 bgcolor=#d6d6d6
| 181343 ||  || — || September 14, 2006 || Catalina || CSS || — || align=right | 3.4 km || 
|-id=344 bgcolor=#fefefe
| 181344 ||  || — || September 14, 2006 || Kitt Peak || Spacewatch || — || align=right data-sort-value="0.94" | 940 m || 
|-id=345 bgcolor=#fefefe
| 181345 ||  || — || September 14, 2006 || Kitt Peak || Spacewatch || — || align=right | 1.0 km || 
|-id=346 bgcolor=#E9E9E9
| 181346 ||  || — || September 14, 2006 || Palomar || NEAT || — || align=right | 3.0 km || 
|-id=347 bgcolor=#E9E9E9
| 181347 ||  || — || September 15, 2006 || Goodricke-Pigott || R. A. Tucker || — || align=right | 4.1 km || 
|-id=348 bgcolor=#fefefe
| 181348 ||  || — || September 15, 2006 || Kitt Peak || Spacewatch || — || align=right data-sort-value="0.98" | 980 m || 
|-id=349 bgcolor=#E9E9E9
| 181349 ||  || — || September 15, 2006 || Kitt Peak || Spacewatch || — || align=right | 3.2 km || 
|-id=350 bgcolor=#E9E9E9
| 181350 ||  || — || September 15, 2006 || Kitt Peak || Spacewatch || — || align=right | 3.1 km || 
|-id=351 bgcolor=#d6d6d6
| 181351 ||  || — || September 14, 2006 || Palomar || NEAT || — || align=right | 5.2 km || 
|-id=352 bgcolor=#fefefe
| 181352 ||  || — || September 12, 2006 || Catalina || CSS || — || align=right | 1.1 km || 
|-id=353 bgcolor=#E9E9E9
| 181353 ||  || — || September 13, 2006 || Palomar || NEAT || — || align=right | 1.5 km || 
|-id=354 bgcolor=#fefefe
| 181354 ||  || — || September 12, 2006 || Catalina || CSS || — || align=right | 1.1 km || 
|-id=355 bgcolor=#fefefe
| 181355 ||  || — || September 14, 2006 || Kitt Peak || Spacewatch || — || align=right data-sort-value="0.96" | 960 m || 
|-id=356 bgcolor=#E9E9E9
| 181356 ||  || — || September 14, 2006 || Kitt Peak || Spacewatch || HNS || align=right | 1.9 km || 
|-id=357 bgcolor=#E9E9E9
| 181357 ||  || — || September 14, 2006 || Kitt Peak || Spacewatch || — || align=right | 1.2 km || 
|-id=358 bgcolor=#E9E9E9
| 181358 ||  || — || September 14, 2006 || Kitt Peak || Spacewatch || — || align=right | 2.8 km || 
|-id=359 bgcolor=#E9E9E9
| 181359 ||  || — || September 14, 2006 || Kitt Peak || Spacewatch || — || align=right | 4.3 km || 
|-id=360 bgcolor=#E9E9E9
| 181360 ||  || — || September 15, 2006 || Kitt Peak || Spacewatch || — || align=right | 3.4 km || 
|-id=361 bgcolor=#fefefe
| 181361 ||  || — || September 15, 2006 || Kitt Peak || Spacewatch || — || align=right data-sort-value="0.85" | 850 m || 
|-id=362 bgcolor=#fefefe
| 181362 ||  || — || September 15, 2006 || Kitt Peak || Spacewatch || — || align=right data-sort-value="0.98" | 980 m || 
|-id=363 bgcolor=#d6d6d6
| 181363 ||  || — || September 15, 2006 || Kitt Peak || Spacewatch || — || align=right | 2.9 km || 
|-id=364 bgcolor=#E9E9E9
| 181364 ||  || — || September 15, 2006 || Kitt Peak || Spacewatch || — || align=right | 2.7 km || 
|-id=365 bgcolor=#fefefe
| 181365 ||  || — || September 15, 2006 || Kitt Peak || Spacewatch || — || align=right | 1.1 km || 
|-id=366 bgcolor=#fefefe
| 181366 ||  || — || September 14, 2006 || Catalina || CSS || — || align=right | 1.2 km || 
|-id=367 bgcolor=#d6d6d6
| 181367 ||  || — || September 14, 2006 || Palomar || NEAT || — || align=right | 4.9 km || 
|-id=368 bgcolor=#E9E9E9
| 181368 ||  || — || September 16, 2006 || Socorro || LINEAR || — || align=right | 3.3 km || 
|-id=369 bgcolor=#fefefe
| 181369 ||  || — || September 16, 2006 || Catalina || CSS || — || align=right | 1.2 km || 
|-id=370 bgcolor=#fefefe
| 181370 ||  || — || September 16, 2006 || Catalina || CSS || — || align=right | 1.1 km || 
|-id=371 bgcolor=#fefefe
| 181371 ||  || — || September 16, 2006 || Catalina || CSS || — || align=right | 1.0 km || 
|-id=372 bgcolor=#E9E9E9
| 181372 ||  || — || September 16, 2006 || Catalina || CSS || — || align=right | 2.8 km || 
|-id=373 bgcolor=#E9E9E9
| 181373 ||  || — || September 16, 2006 || Palomar || NEAT || BAR || align=right | 1.9 km || 
|-id=374 bgcolor=#fefefe
| 181374 ||  || — || September 16, 2006 || Anderson Mesa || LONEOS || — || align=right | 1.3 km || 
|-id=375 bgcolor=#fefefe
| 181375 ||  || — || September 16, 2006 || Anderson Mesa || LONEOS || FLO || align=right | 1.2 km || 
|-id=376 bgcolor=#E9E9E9
| 181376 ||  || — || September 16, 2006 || Anderson Mesa || LONEOS || — || align=right | 3.6 km || 
|-id=377 bgcolor=#fefefe
| 181377 ||  || — || September 17, 2006 || Socorro || LINEAR || FLO || align=right data-sort-value="0.87" | 870 m || 
|-id=378 bgcolor=#fefefe
| 181378 ||  || — || September 17, 2006 || Catalina || CSS || — || align=right data-sort-value="0.97" | 970 m || 
|-id=379 bgcolor=#E9E9E9
| 181379 ||  || — || September 17, 2006 || Kitt Peak || Spacewatch || MIS || align=right | 3.3 km || 
|-id=380 bgcolor=#E9E9E9
| 181380 ||  || — || September 17, 2006 || Anderson Mesa || LONEOS || — || align=right | 2.8 km || 
|-id=381 bgcolor=#fefefe
| 181381 ||  || — || September 17, 2006 || Kitt Peak || Spacewatch || — || align=right data-sort-value="0.90" | 900 m || 
|-id=382 bgcolor=#fefefe
| 181382 ||  || — || September 17, 2006 || Kitt Peak || Spacewatch || — || align=right | 1.1 km || 
|-id=383 bgcolor=#E9E9E9
| 181383 ||  || — || September 16, 2006 || Anderson Mesa || LONEOS || — || align=right | 2.1 km || 
|-id=384 bgcolor=#E9E9E9
| 181384 ||  || — || September 19, 2006 || Catalina || CSS || — || align=right | 1.9 km || 
|-id=385 bgcolor=#fefefe
| 181385 ||  || — || September 19, 2006 || Catalina || CSS || V || align=right data-sort-value="0.87" | 870 m || 
|-id=386 bgcolor=#fefefe
| 181386 ||  || — || September 18, 2006 || Kitt Peak || Spacewatch || NYS || align=right | 1.0 km || 
|-id=387 bgcolor=#E9E9E9
| 181387 ||  || — || September 17, 2006 || Anderson Mesa || LONEOS || — || align=right | 1.8 km || 
|-id=388 bgcolor=#E9E9E9
| 181388 ||  || — || September 18, 2006 || Catalina || CSS || GEF || align=right | 1.7 km || 
|-id=389 bgcolor=#E9E9E9
| 181389 ||  || — || September 18, 2006 || Catalina || CSS || — || align=right | 4.4 km || 
|-id=390 bgcolor=#E9E9E9
| 181390 ||  || — || September 19, 2006 || Kitt Peak || Spacewatch || — || align=right | 1.7 km || 
|-id=391 bgcolor=#d6d6d6
| 181391 ||  || — || September 19, 2006 || Kitt Peak || Spacewatch || — || align=right | 3.3 km || 
|-id=392 bgcolor=#E9E9E9
| 181392 ||  || — || September 23, 2006 || Piszkéstető || K. Sárneczky, Z. Kuli || — || align=right | 3.5 km || 
|-id=393 bgcolor=#fefefe
| 181393 ||  || — || September 18, 2006 || Kitt Peak || Spacewatch || MAS || align=right data-sort-value="0.90" | 900 m || 
|-id=394 bgcolor=#E9E9E9
| 181394 ||  || — || September 18, 2006 || Kitt Peak || Spacewatch || HEN || align=right | 1.2 km || 
|-id=395 bgcolor=#fefefe
| 181395 ||  || — || September 18, 2006 || Kitt Peak || Spacewatch || — || align=right data-sort-value="0.98" | 980 m || 
|-id=396 bgcolor=#E9E9E9
| 181396 ||  || — || September 18, 2006 || Kitt Peak || Spacewatch || AST || align=right | 3.2 km || 
|-id=397 bgcolor=#E9E9E9
| 181397 ||  || — || September 18, 2006 || Kitt Peak || Spacewatch || HEN || align=right | 1.8 km || 
|-id=398 bgcolor=#fefefe
| 181398 ||  || — || September 19, 2006 || Anderson Mesa || LONEOS || V || align=right data-sort-value="0.89" | 890 m || 
|-id=399 bgcolor=#E9E9E9
| 181399 ||  || — || September 21, 2006 || Anderson Mesa || LONEOS || — || align=right | 1.7 km || 
|-id=400 bgcolor=#d6d6d6
| 181400 ||  || — || September 24, 2006 || Anderson Mesa || LONEOS || — || align=right | 5.4 km || 
|}

181401–181500 

|-bgcolor=#fefefe
| 181401 ||  || — || September 24, 2006 || Kitt Peak || Spacewatch || — || align=right | 1.1 km || 
|-id=402 bgcolor=#E9E9E9
| 181402 ||  || — || September 24, 2006 || Junk Bond || D. Healy || — || align=right | 3.8 km || 
|-id=403 bgcolor=#E9E9E9
| 181403 ||  || — || September 19, 2006 || Catalina || CSS || — || align=right | 1.7 km || 
|-id=404 bgcolor=#fefefe
| 181404 ||  || — || September 19, 2006 || Catalina || CSS || — || align=right | 1.1 km || 
|-id=405 bgcolor=#E9E9E9
| 181405 ||  || — || September 21, 2006 || Anderson Mesa || LONEOS || HNS || align=right | 1.6 km || 
|-id=406 bgcolor=#fefefe
| 181406 ||  || — || September 16, 2006 || Catalina || CSS || — || align=right | 1.4 km || 
|-id=407 bgcolor=#d6d6d6
| 181407 ||  || — || September 17, 2006 || Catalina || CSS || — || align=right | 3.1 km || 
|-id=408 bgcolor=#fefefe
| 181408 ||  || — || September 20, 2006 || Anderson Mesa || LONEOS || — || align=right | 1.3 km || 
|-id=409 bgcolor=#E9E9E9
| 181409 ||  || — || September 25, 2006 || Anderson Mesa || LONEOS || — || align=right | 1.3 km || 
|-id=410 bgcolor=#E9E9E9
| 181410 ||  || — || September 24, 2006 || Anderson Mesa || LONEOS || — || align=right | 3.4 km || 
|-id=411 bgcolor=#fefefe
| 181411 ||  || — || September 25, 2006 || Kitt Peak || Spacewatch || — || align=right data-sort-value="0.93" | 930 m || 
|-id=412 bgcolor=#fefefe
| 181412 ||  || — || September 25, 2006 || Socorro || LINEAR || — || align=right | 1.3 km || 
|-id=413 bgcolor=#fefefe
| 181413 ||  || — || September 25, 2006 || Kitt Peak || Spacewatch || — || align=right | 1.3 km || 
|-id=414 bgcolor=#d6d6d6
| 181414 ||  || — || September 25, 2006 || Mount Lemmon || Mount Lemmon Survey || — || align=right | 4.6 km || 
|-id=415 bgcolor=#E9E9E9
| 181415 ||  || — || September 26, 2006 || Mount Lemmon || Mount Lemmon Survey || — || align=right | 2.2 km || 
|-id=416 bgcolor=#fefefe
| 181416 ||  || — || September 26, 2006 || Mount Lemmon || Mount Lemmon Survey || — || align=right data-sort-value="0.92" | 920 m || 
|-id=417 bgcolor=#fefefe
| 181417 ||  || — || September 27, 2006 || Mount Lemmon || Mount Lemmon Survey || — || align=right data-sort-value="0.99" | 990 m || 
|-id=418 bgcolor=#fefefe
| 181418 ||  || — || September 27, 2006 || Kitt Peak || Spacewatch || — || align=right | 1.1 km || 
|-id=419 bgcolor=#E9E9E9
| 181419 Dragonera ||  ||  || September 28, 2006 || OAM || OAM Obs. || — || align=right | 4.0 km || 
|-id=420 bgcolor=#E9E9E9
| 181420 ||  || — || September 26, 2006 || Kitt Peak || Spacewatch || — || align=right | 3.2 km || 
|-id=421 bgcolor=#E9E9E9
| 181421 ||  || — || September 26, 2006 || Mount Lemmon || Mount Lemmon Survey || — || align=right | 1.4 km || 
|-id=422 bgcolor=#E9E9E9
| 181422 ||  || — || September 27, 2006 || Kitt Peak || Spacewatch || — || align=right | 1.9 km || 
|-id=423 bgcolor=#fefefe
| 181423 ||  || — || September 27, 2006 || Kitt Peak || Spacewatch || — || align=right | 1.1 km || 
|-id=424 bgcolor=#E9E9E9
| 181424 ||  || — || September 28, 2006 || Socorro || LINEAR || — || align=right | 1.8 km || 
|-id=425 bgcolor=#E9E9E9
| 181425 ||  || — || September 28, 2006 || Goodricke-Pigott || R. A. Tucker || — || align=right | 2.0 km || 
|-id=426 bgcolor=#E9E9E9
| 181426 ||  || — || September 17, 2006 || Catalina || CSS || — || align=right | 1.4 km || 
|-id=427 bgcolor=#E9E9E9
| 181427 ||  || — || September 19, 2006 || Catalina || CSS || JUN || align=right | 1.5 km || 
|-id=428 bgcolor=#E9E9E9
| 181428 ||  || — || September 26, 2006 || Catalina || CSS || — || align=right | 4.7 km || 
|-id=429 bgcolor=#E9E9E9
| 181429 ||  || — || September 27, 2006 || Kitt Peak || Spacewatch || — || align=right | 2.6 km || 
|-id=430 bgcolor=#fefefe
| 181430 ||  || — || September 27, 2006 || Kitt Peak || Spacewatch || — || align=right data-sort-value="0.91" | 910 m || 
|-id=431 bgcolor=#fefefe
| 181431 ||  || — || September 27, 2006 || Kitt Peak || Spacewatch || V || align=right | 1.0 km || 
|-id=432 bgcolor=#E9E9E9
| 181432 ||  || — || September 27, 2006 || Kitt Peak || Spacewatch || — || align=right | 1.1 km || 
|-id=433 bgcolor=#E9E9E9
| 181433 ||  || — || September 28, 2006 || Kitt Peak || Spacewatch || — || align=right | 1.3 km || 
|-id=434 bgcolor=#E9E9E9
| 181434 ||  || — || September 28, 2006 || Kitt Peak || Spacewatch || AGN || align=right | 3.3 km || 
|-id=435 bgcolor=#d6d6d6
| 181435 ||  || — || September 28, 2006 || Kitt Peak || Spacewatch || — || align=right | 3.4 km || 
|-id=436 bgcolor=#E9E9E9
| 181436 ||  || — || September 28, 2006 || Kitt Peak || Spacewatch || — || align=right | 3.7 km || 
|-id=437 bgcolor=#d6d6d6
| 181437 ||  || — || September 28, 2006 || Kitt Peak || Spacewatch || — || align=right | 2.6 km || 
|-id=438 bgcolor=#fefefe
| 181438 ||  || — || September 30, 2006 || Catalina || CSS || V || align=right | 1.0 km || 
|-id=439 bgcolor=#E9E9E9
| 181439 ||  || — || September 30, 2006 || Catalina || CSS || — || align=right | 3.4 km || 
|-id=440 bgcolor=#d6d6d6
| 181440 ||  || — || September 27, 2006 || Apache Point || A. C. Becker || TIR || align=right | 3.8 km || 
|-id=441 bgcolor=#d6d6d6
| 181441 ||  || — || September 28, 2006 || Apache Point || A. C. Becker || HYG || align=right | 3.7 km || 
|-id=442 bgcolor=#d6d6d6
| 181442 ||  || — || September 19, 2006 || Catalina || CSS || — || align=right | 3.7 km || 
|-id=443 bgcolor=#fefefe
| 181443 ||  || — || September 28, 2006 || Mount Lemmon || Mount Lemmon Survey || NYS || align=right | 1.1 km || 
|-id=444 bgcolor=#E9E9E9
| 181444 ||  || — || October 10, 2006 || Palomar || NEAT || — || align=right | 4.2 km || 
|-id=445 bgcolor=#fefefe
| 181445 ||  || — || October 11, 2006 || Kitt Peak || Spacewatch || SUL || align=right | 2.2 km || 
|-id=446 bgcolor=#d6d6d6
| 181446 ||  || — || October 11, 2006 || Kitt Peak || Spacewatch || — || align=right | 4.9 km || 
|-id=447 bgcolor=#d6d6d6
| 181447 ||  || — || October 11, 2006 || Kitt Peak || Spacewatch || — || align=right | 4.2 km || 
|-id=448 bgcolor=#E9E9E9
| 181448 ||  || — || October 11, 2006 || Kitt Peak || Spacewatch || — || align=right | 3.1 km || 
|-id=449 bgcolor=#E9E9E9
| 181449 ||  || — || October 11, 2006 || Kitt Peak || Spacewatch || MIS || align=right | 3.6 km || 
|-id=450 bgcolor=#fefefe
| 181450 ||  || — || October 11, 2006 || Kitt Peak || Spacewatch || — || align=right | 1.5 km || 
|-id=451 bgcolor=#d6d6d6
| 181451 ||  || — || October 11, 2006 || Kitt Peak || Spacewatch || KOR || align=right | 1.8 km || 
|-id=452 bgcolor=#fefefe
| 181452 ||  || — || October 11, 2006 || Kitt Peak || Spacewatch || FLO || align=right data-sort-value="0.77" | 770 m || 
|-id=453 bgcolor=#fefefe
| 181453 ||  || — || October 12, 2006 || Kitt Peak || Spacewatch || — || align=right | 1.00 km || 
|-id=454 bgcolor=#E9E9E9
| 181454 ||  || — || October 12, 2006 || Kitt Peak || Spacewatch || MRX || align=right | 1.4 km || 
|-id=455 bgcolor=#d6d6d6
| 181455 ||  || — || October 12, 2006 || Kitt Peak || Spacewatch || — || align=right | 5.6 km || 
|-id=456 bgcolor=#fefefe
| 181456 ||  || — || October 12, 2006 || Kitt Peak || Spacewatch || V || align=right | 1.2 km || 
|-id=457 bgcolor=#E9E9E9
| 181457 ||  || — || October 12, 2006 || Kitt Peak || Spacewatch || — || align=right | 2.3 km || 
|-id=458 bgcolor=#fefefe
| 181458 ||  || — || October 12, 2006 || Kitt Peak || Spacewatch || — || align=right | 1.3 km || 
|-id=459 bgcolor=#E9E9E9
| 181459 ||  || — || October 12, 2006 || Kitt Peak || Spacewatch || — || align=right | 1.5 km || 
|-id=460 bgcolor=#fefefe
| 181460 ||  || — || October 12, 2006 || Palomar || NEAT || — || align=right data-sort-value="0.90" | 900 m || 
|-id=461 bgcolor=#d6d6d6
| 181461 ||  || — || October 12, 2006 || Palomar || NEAT || — || align=right | 4.3 km || 
|-id=462 bgcolor=#E9E9E9
| 181462 ||  || — || October 12, 2006 || Kitt Peak || Spacewatch || — || align=right | 5.3 km || 
|-id=463 bgcolor=#E9E9E9
| 181463 ||  || — || October 12, 2006 || Kitt Peak || Spacewatch || HEN || align=right | 1.2 km || 
|-id=464 bgcolor=#fefefe
| 181464 ||  || — || October 12, 2006 || Palomar || NEAT || FLO || align=right | 1.0 km || 
|-id=465 bgcolor=#E9E9E9
| 181465 ||  || — || October 12, 2006 || Palomar || NEAT || — || align=right | 1.5 km || 
|-id=466 bgcolor=#d6d6d6
| 181466 ||  || — || October 12, 2006 || Palomar || NEAT || — || align=right | 4.3 km || 
|-id=467 bgcolor=#d6d6d6
| 181467 ||  || — || October 12, 2006 || Palomar || NEAT || — || align=right | 7.0 km || 
|-id=468 bgcolor=#fefefe
| 181468 ||  || — || October 13, 2006 || Kitt Peak || Spacewatch || V || align=right data-sort-value="0.80" | 800 m || 
|-id=469 bgcolor=#fefefe
| 181469 ||  || — || October 10, 2006 || Palomar || NEAT || — || align=right | 1.4 km || 
|-id=470 bgcolor=#E9E9E9
| 181470 ||  || — || October 10, 2006 || Palomar || NEAT || — || align=right | 1.3 km || 
|-id=471 bgcolor=#d6d6d6
| 181471 ||  || — || October 11, 2006 || Palomar || NEAT || — || align=right | 4.4 km || 
|-id=472 bgcolor=#E9E9E9
| 181472 ||  || — || October 11, 2006 || Palomar || NEAT || — || align=right | 3.3 km || 
|-id=473 bgcolor=#fefefe
| 181473 ||  || — || October 11, 2006 || Palomar || NEAT || — || align=right data-sort-value="0.98" | 980 m || 
|-id=474 bgcolor=#E9E9E9
| 181474 ||  || — || October 11, 2006 || Palomar || NEAT || — || align=right | 3.7 km || 
|-id=475 bgcolor=#d6d6d6
| 181475 ||  || — || October 13, 2006 || Kitt Peak || Spacewatch || — || align=right | 4.3 km || 
|-id=476 bgcolor=#E9E9E9
| 181476 ||  || — || October 13, 2006 || Kitt Peak || Spacewatch || HOF || align=right | 3.3 km || 
|-id=477 bgcolor=#E9E9E9
| 181477 ||  || — || October 13, 2006 || Kitt Peak || Spacewatch || — || align=right | 2.9 km || 
|-id=478 bgcolor=#E9E9E9
| 181478 ||  || — || October 13, 2006 || Kitt Peak || Spacewatch || — || align=right | 1.2 km || 
|-id=479 bgcolor=#E9E9E9
| 181479 ||  || — || October 13, 2006 || Kitt Peak || Spacewatch || — || align=right | 3.0 km || 
|-id=480 bgcolor=#E9E9E9
| 181480 ||  || — || October 13, 2006 || Kitt Peak || Spacewatch || — || align=right | 2.6 km || 
|-id=481 bgcolor=#d6d6d6
| 181481 ||  || — || October 15, 2006 || Kitt Peak || Spacewatch || — || align=right | 3.2 km || 
|-id=482 bgcolor=#E9E9E9
| 181482 ||  || — || October 15, 2006 || Kitt Peak || Spacewatch || HOF || align=right | 3.0 km || 
|-id=483 bgcolor=#E9E9E9
| 181483 Ampleforth ||  ||  || October 15, 2006 || Côtes de Meuse || M. Dawson || — || align=right | 2.0 km || 
|-id=484 bgcolor=#d6d6d6
| 181484 ||  || — || October 12, 2006 || Palomar || NEAT || — || align=right | 6.5 km || 
|-id=485 bgcolor=#E9E9E9
| 181485 ||  || — || October 15, 2006 || Kitt Peak || Spacewatch || — || align=right | 1.5 km || 
|-id=486 bgcolor=#fefefe
| 181486 ||  || — || October 15, 2006 || Kitt Peak || Spacewatch || V || align=right data-sort-value="0.83" | 830 m || 
|-id=487 bgcolor=#d6d6d6
| 181487 ||  || — || October 15, 2006 || Kitt Peak || Spacewatch || KAR || align=right | 1.6 km || 
|-id=488 bgcolor=#d6d6d6
| 181488 ||  || — || October 15, 2006 || Kitt Peak || Spacewatch || THM || align=right | 2.6 km || 
|-id=489 bgcolor=#E9E9E9
| 181489 ||  || — || October 11, 2006 || Palomar || NEAT || EUN || align=right | 1.9 km || 
|-id=490 bgcolor=#fefefe
| 181490 ||  || — || October 13, 2006 || Kitt Peak || Spacewatch || V || align=right | 1.0 km || 
|-id=491 bgcolor=#fefefe
| 181491 ||  || — || October 1, 2006 || Apache Point || A. C. Becker || — || align=right | 1.4 km || 
|-id=492 bgcolor=#E9E9E9
| 181492 ||  || — || October 16, 2006 || Wrightwood || J. W. Young || — || align=right | 3.6 km || 
|-id=493 bgcolor=#d6d6d6
| 181493 ||  || — || October 16, 2006 || Kitt Peak || Spacewatch || KOR || align=right | 1.7 km || 
|-id=494 bgcolor=#fefefe
| 181494 ||  || — || October 16, 2006 || San Marcello || Pistoia Mountains Obs. || — || align=right | 1.2 km || 
|-id=495 bgcolor=#E9E9E9
| 181495 ||  || — || October 16, 2006 || Kitt Peak || Spacewatch || — || align=right | 2.6 km || 
|-id=496 bgcolor=#d6d6d6
| 181496 ||  || — || October 16, 2006 || Catalina || CSS || EMA || align=right | 3.7 km || 
|-id=497 bgcolor=#E9E9E9
| 181497 ||  || — || October 16, 2006 || Catalina || CSS || — || align=right | 3.1 km || 
|-id=498 bgcolor=#d6d6d6
| 181498 ||  || — || October 17, 2006 || Mount Lemmon || Mount Lemmon Survey || THM || align=right | 3.2 km || 
|-id=499 bgcolor=#d6d6d6
| 181499 ||  || — || October 17, 2006 || Mount Lemmon || Mount Lemmon Survey || — || align=right | 2.3 km || 
|-id=500 bgcolor=#E9E9E9
| 181500 ||  || — || October 17, 2006 || Mount Lemmon || Mount Lemmon Survey || — || align=right | 2.6 km || 
|}

181501–181600 

|-bgcolor=#E9E9E9
| 181501 ||  || — || October 16, 2006 || Kitt Peak || Spacewatch || — || align=right | 1.9 km || 
|-id=502 bgcolor=#E9E9E9
| 181502 ||  || — || October 16, 2006 || Kitt Peak || Spacewatch || WIT || align=right | 1.2 km || 
|-id=503 bgcolor=#d6d6d6
| 181503 ||  || — || October 16, 2006 || Kitt Peak || Spacewatch || KOR || align=right | 1.8 km || 
|-id=504 bgcolor=#E9E9E9
| 181504 ||  || — || October 16, 2006 || Kitt Peak || Spacewatch || HEN || align=right | 1.2 km || 
|-id=505 bgcolor=#E9E9E9
| 181505 ||  || — || October 16, 2006 || Kitt Peak || Spacewatch || — || align=right | 1.9 km || 
|-id=506 bgcolor=#d6d6d6
| 181506 ||  || — || October 16, 2006 || Kitt Peak || Spacewatch || — || align=right | 3.3 km || 
|-id=507 bgcolor=#fefefe
| 181507 ||  || — || October 16, 2006 || Kitt Peak || Spacewatch || — || align=right | 1.4 km || 
|-id=508 bgcolor=#fefefe
| 181508 ||  || — || October 16, 2006 || Kitt Peak || Spacewatch || fast? || align=right data-sort-value="0.91" | 910 m || 
|-id=509 bgcolor=#E9E9E9
| 181509 ||  || — || October 17, 2006 || Mount Lemmon || Mount Lemmon Survey || — || align=right | 2.4 km || 
|-id=510 bgcolor=#d6d6d6
| 181510 ||  || — || October 21, 2006 || Mount Lemmon || Mount Lemmon Survey || Tj (2.98) || align=right | 8.9 km || 
|-id=511 bgcolor=#fefefe
| 181511 ||  || — || October 16, 2006 || Catalina || CSS || — || align=right | 1.1 km || 
|-id=512 bgcolor=#E9E9E9
| 181512 ||  || — || October 16, 2006 || Catalina || CSS || ADE || align=right | 3.9 km || 
|-id=513 bgcolor=#d6d6d6
| 181513 ||  || — || October 16, 2006 || Catalina || CSS || — || align=right | 4.9 km || 
|-id=514 bgcolor=#E9E9E9
| 181514 ||  || — || October 17, 2006 || Kitt Peak || Spacewatch || — || align=right | 3.3 km || 
|-id=515 bgcolor=#fefefe
| 181515 ||  || — || October 17, 2006 || Kitt Peak || Spacewatch || — || align=right | 1.4 km || 
|-id=516 bgcolor=#E9E9E9
| 181516 ||  || — || October 17, 2006 || Kitt Peak || Spacewatch || AGN || align=right | 1.4 km || 
|-id=517 bgcolor=#E9E9E9
| 181517 ||  || — || October 17, 2006 || Kitt Peak || Spacewatch || — || align=right | 2.7 km || 
|-id=518 bgcolor=#d6d6d6
| 181518 Ursulakleguin ||  ||  || October 17, 2006 || Mount Lemmon || Mount Lemmon Survey || — || align=right | 4.0 km || 
|-id=519 bgcolor=#fefefe
| 181519 ||  || — || October 17, 2006 || Mount Lemmon || Mount Lemmon Survey || NYS || align=right | 1.2 km || 
|-id=520 bgcolor=#fefefe
| 181520 ||  || — || October 18, 2006 || Kitt Peak || Spacewatch || FLO || align=right data-sort-value="0.94" | 940 m || 
|-id=521 bgcolor=#E9E9E9
| 181521 ||  || — || October 18, 2006 || Kitt Peak || Spacewatch || — || align=right | 2.7 km || 
|-id=522 bgcolor=#fefefe
| 181522 ||  || — || October 18, 2006 || Kitt Peak || Spacewatch || — || align=right | 1.2 km || 
|-id=523 bgcolor=#d6d6d6
| 181523 ||  || — || October 18, 2006 || Kitt Peak || Spacewatch || — || align=right | 3.2 km || 
|-id=524 bgcolor=#fefefe
| 181524 ||  || — || October 18, 2006 || Kitt Peak || Spacewatch || — || align=right | 1.4 km || 
|-id=525 bgcolor=#fefefe
| 181525 ||  || — || October 19, 2006 || Kitt Peak || Spacewatch || — || align=right | 1.6 km || 
|-id=526 bgcolor=#d6d6d6
| 181526 ||  || — || October 19, 2006 || Kitt Peak || Spacewatch || — || align=right | 3.5 km || 
|-id=527 bgcolor=#E9E9E9
| 181527 ||  || — || October 19, 2006 || Kitt Peak || Spacewatch || — || align=right | 1.6 km || 
|-id=528 bgcolor=#d6d6d6
| 181528 ||  || — || October 19, 2006 || Kitt Peak || Spacewatch || THM || align=right | 2.8 km || 
|-id=529 bgcolor=#d6d6d6
| 181529 ||  || — || October 19, 2006 || Kitt Peak || Spacewatch || — || align=right | 2.9 km || 
|-id=530 bgcolor=#E9E9E9
| 181530 ||  || — || October 19, 2006 || Mount Lemmon || Mount Lemmon Survey || — || align=right | 1.6 km || 
|-id=531 bgcolor=#fefefe
| 181531 ||  || — || October 19, 2006 || Catalina || CSS || — || align=right | 1.3 km || 
|-id=532 bgcolor=#E9E9E9
| 181532 ||  || — || October 19, 2006 || Mount Lemmon || Mount Lemmon Survey || — || align=right | 2.0 km || 
|-id=533 bgcolor=#E9E9E9
| 181533 ||  || — || October 19, 2006 || Kitt Peak || Spacewatch || — || align=right | 2.3 km || 
|-id=534 bgcolor=#d6d6d6
| 181534 ||  || — || October 20, 2006 || Kitt Peak || Spacewatch || — || align=right | 3.1 km || 
|-id=535 bgcolor=#d6d6d6
| 181535 ||  || — || October 21, 2006 || Mount Lemmon || Mount Lemmon Survey || — || align=right | 4.1 km || 
|-id=536 bgcolor=#d6d6d6
| 181536 ||  || — || October 19, 2006 || Mount Lemmon || Mount Lemmon Survey || — || align=right | 4.1 km || 
|-id=537 bgcolor=#E9E9E9
| 181537 ||  || — || October 16, 2006 || Catalina || CSS || — || align=right | 2.7 km || 
|-id=538 bgcolor=#d6d6d6
| 181538 ||  || — || October 16, 2006 || Catalina || CSS || — || align=right | 2.8 km || 
|-id=539 bgcolor=#d6d6d6
| 181539 ||  || — || October 16, 2006 || Catalina || CSS || — || align=right | 3.1 km || 
|-id=540 bgcolor=#E9E9E9
| 181540 ||  || — || October 16, 2006 || Catalina || CSS || — || align=right | 2.2 km || 
|-id=541 bgcolor=#E9E9E9
| 181541 ||  || — || October 19, 2006 || Catalina || CSS || EUN || align=right | 2.0 km || 
|-id=542 bgcolor=#E9E9E9
| 181542 ||  || — || October 19, 2006 || Catalina || CSS || — || align=right | 2.7 km || 
|-id=543 bgcolor=#E9E9E9
| 181543 ||  || — || October 19, 2006 || Catalina || CSS || GEF || align=right | 1.8 km || 
|-id=544 bgcolor=#d6d6d6
| 181544 ||  || — || October 19, 2006 || Catalina || CSS || — || align=right | 3.4 km || 
|-id=545 bgcolor=#d6d6d6
| 181545 ||  || — || October 20, 2006 || Kitt Peak || Spacewatch || — || align=right | 3.1 km || 
|-id=546 bgcolor=#E9E9E9
| 181546 ||  || — || October 22, 2006 || Palomar || NEAT || — || align=right | 2.3 km || 
|-id=547 bgcolor=#d6d6d6
| 181547 ||  || — || October 31, 2006 || 7300 Observatory || W. K. Y. Yeung || — || align=right | 4.2 km || 
|-id=548 bgcolor=#E9E9E9
| 181548 ||  || — || October 16, 2006 || Kitt Peak || Spacewatch || — || align=right | 3.1 km || 
|-id=549 bgcolor=#fefefe
| 181549 ||  || — || October 23, 2006 || Kitt Peak || Spacewatch || — || align=right | 1.2 km || 
|-id=550 bgcolor=#d6d6d6
| 181550 ||  || — || October 27, 2006 || Mount Lemmon || Mount Lemmon Survey || — || align=right | 3.1 km || 
|-id=551 bgcolor=#E9E9E9
| 181551 ||  || — || October 27, 2006 || Mount Lemmon || Mount Lemmon Survey || — || align=right | 3.2 km || 
|-id=552 bgcolor=#d6d6d6
| 181552 ||  || — || October 27, 2006 || Kitt Peak || Spacewatch || — || align=right | 3.6 km || 
|-id=553 bgcolor=#E9E9E9
| 181553 ||  || — || October 27, 2006 || Mount Lemmon || Mount Lemmon Survey || — || align=right | 4.1 km || 
|-id=554 bgcolor=#d6d6d6
| 181554 ||  || — || October 27, 2006 || Kitt Peak || Spacewatch || 628 || align=right | 5.8 km || 
|-id=555 bgcolor=#E9E9E9
| 181555 ||  || — || October 27, 2006 || Kitt Peak || Spacewatch || — || align=right | 2.6 km || 
|-id=556 bgcolor=#fefefe
| 181556 ||  || — || October 28, 2006 || Kitt Peak || Spacewatch || NYS || align=right data-sort-value="0.87" | 870 m || 
|-id=557 bgcolor=#d6d6d6
| 181557 ||  || — || October 28, 2006 || Mount Lemmon || Mount Lemmon Survey || — || align=right | 3.2 km || 
|-id=558 bgcolor=#E9E9E9
| 181558 ||  || — || October 28, 2006 || Kitt Peak || Spacewatch || MRX || align=right | 1.3 km || 
|-id=559 bgcolor=#E9E9E9
| 181559 ||  || — || October 28, 2006 || Kitt Peak || Spacewatch || — || align=right | 1.9 km || 
|-id=560 bgcolor=#d6d6d6
| 181560 ||  || — || October 28, 2006 || Mount Lemmon || Mount Lemmon Survey || KOR || align=right | 1.5 km || 
|-id=561 bgcolor=#E9E9E9
| 181561 ||  || — || October 28, 2006 || Kitt Peak || Spacewatch || — || align=right | 1.5 km || 
|-id=562 bgcolor=#fefefe
| 181562 Paulrosendall ||  ||  || October 20, 2006 || Kitt Peak || M. W. Buie || V || align=right | 1.1 km || 
|-id=563 bgcolor=#d6d6d6
| 181563 ||  || — || October 27, 2006 || Catalina || CSS || — || align=right | 3.4 km || 
|-id=564 bgcolor=#d6d6d6
| 181564 ||  || — || October 17, 2006 || Catalina || CSS || — || align=right | 4.1 km || 
|-id=565 bgcolor=#E9E9E9
| 181565 ||  || — || November 10, 2006 || Kitt Peak || Spacewatch || — || align=right | 2.2 km || 
|-id=566 bgcolor=#d6d6d6
| 181566 ||  || — || November 11, 2006 || Kitt Peak || Spacewatch || EOS || align=right | 3.0 km || 
|-id=567 bgcolor=#d6d6d6
| 181567 ||  || — || November 11, 2006 || Catalina || CSS || — || align=right | 3.9 km || 
|-id=568 bgcolor=#d6d6d6
| 181568 ||  || — || November 9, 2006 || Kitt Peak || Spacewatch || — || align=right | 3.3 km || 
|-id=569 bgcolor=#d6d6d6
| 181569 Leetyphoon ||  ||  || November 9, 2006 || Lulin Observatory || H.-C. Lin, Q.-z. Ye || — || align=right | 3.1 km || 
|-id=570 bgcolor=#fefefe
| 181570 ||  || — || November 10, 2006 || Kitt Peak || Spacewatch || — || align=right data-sort-value="0.98" | 980 m || 
|-id=571 bgcolor=#E9E9E9
| 181571 ||  || — || November 10, 2006 || Kitt Peak || Spacewatch || — || align=right | 2.7 km || 
|-id=572 bgcolor=#d6d6d6
| 181572 ||  || — || November 10, 2006 || Kitt Peak || Spacewatch || THM || align=right | 3.3 km || 
|-id=573 bgcolor=#d6d6d6
| 181573 ||  || — || November 11, 2006 || Catalina || CSS || — || align=right | 3.6 km || 
|-id=574 bgcolor=#E9E9E9
| 181574 ||  || — || November 10, 2006 || Kitt Peak || Spacewatch || HOF || align=right | 3.8 km || 
|-id=575 bgcolor=#E9E9E9
| 181575 ||  || — || November 11, 2006 || Kitt Peak || Spacewatch || WIT || align=right | 1.2 km || 
|-id=576 bgcolor=#E9E9E9
| 181576 ||  || — || November 11, 2006 || Kitt Peak || Spacewatch || — || align=right | 2.4 km || 
|-id=577 bgcolor=#E9E9E9
| 181577 ||  || — || November 11, 2006 || Kitt Peak || Spacewatch || — || align=right | 2.6 km || 
|-id=578 bgcolor=#d6d6d6
| 181578 ||  || — || November 11, 2006 || Mount Lemmon || Mount Lemmon Survey || EOS || align=right | 3.9 km || 
|-id=579 bgcolor=#fefefe
| 181579 ||  || — || November 11, 2006 || Mount Lemmon || Mount Lemmon Survey || V || align=right | 1.2 km || 
|-id=580 bgcolor=#E9E9E9
| 181580 ||  || — || November 12, 2006 || Mount Lemmon || Mount Lemmon Survey || HOF || align=right | 4.3 km || 
|-id=581 bgcolor=#fefefe
| 181581 ||  || — || November 14, 2006 || Catalina || CSS || FLO || align=right | 1.0 km || 
|-id=582 bgcolor=#E9E9E9
| 181582 ||  || — || November 12, 2006 || Catalina || CSS || — || align=right | 2.8 km || 
|-id=583 bgcolor=#E9E9E9
| 181583 ||  || — || November 13, 2006 || Palomar || NEAT || — || align=right | 2.1 km || 
|-id=584 bgcolor=#E9E9E9
| 181584 ||  || — || November 13, 2006 || Mount Lemmon || Mount Lemmon Survey || — || align=right | 2.3 km || 
|-id=585 bgcolor=#d6d6d6
| 181585 ||  || — || November 14, 2006 || Kitt Peak || Spacewatch || KOR || align=right | 1.7 km || 
|-id=586 bgcolor=#E9E9E9
| 181586 ||  || — || November 15, 2006 || Kitt Peak || Spacewatch || — || align=right | 2.4 km || 
|-id=587 bgcolor=#fefefe
| 181587 ||  || — || November 15, 2006 || Catalina || CSS || — || align=right | 1.5 km || 
|-id=588 bgcolor=#E9E9E9
| 181588 ||  || — || November 15, 2006 || Kitt Peak || Spacewatch || — || align=right | 3.1 km || 
|-id=589 bgcolor=#E9E9E9
| 181589 ||  || — || November 15, 2006 || Socorro || LINEAR || — || align=right | 4.1 km || 
|-id=590 bgcolor=#d6d6d6
| 181590 ||  || — || November 15, 2006 || Kitt Peak || Spacewatch || THM || align=right | 3.7 km || 
|-id=591 bgcolor=#d6d6d6
| 181591 ||  || — || November 15, 2006 || Catalina || CSS || — || align=right | 4.9 km || 
|-id=592 bgcolor=#fefefe
| 181592 ||  || — || November 15, 2006 || Mount Lemmon || Mount Lemmon Survey || — || align=right | 1.8 km || 
|-id=593 bgcolor=#E9E9E9
| 181593 ||  || — || November 9, 2006 || Palomar || NEAT || HOF || align=right | 5.2 km || 
|-id=594 bgcolor=#d6d6d6
| 181594 ||  || — || November 8, 2006 || Palomar || NEAT || EOS || align=right | 5.0 km || 
|-id=595 bgcolor=#fefefe
| 181595 ||  || — || November 15, 2006 || Mount Lemmon || Mount Lemmon Survey || MAS || align=right data-sort-value="0.80" | 800 m || 
|-id=596 bgcolor=#d6d6d6
| 181596 ||  || — || November 18, 2006 || Pla D'Arguines || R. Ferrando || — || align=right | 3.7 km || 
|-id=597 bgcolor=#E9E9E9
| 181597 ||  || — || November 16, 2006 || Kitt Peak || Spacewatch || — || align=right | 2.7 km || 
|-id=598 bgcolor=#d6d6d6
| 181598 ||  || — || November 17, 2006 || Mount Lemmon || Mount Lemmon Survey || VER || align=right | 3.9 km || 
|-id=599 bgcolor=#E9E9E9
| 181599 ||  || — || November 17, 2006 || Mount Lemmon || Mount Lemmon Survey || NEM || align=right | 3.5 km || 
|-id=600 bgcolor=#d6d6d6
| 181600 ||  || — || November 16, 2006 || Kitt Peak || Spacewatch || 615 || align=right | 2.1 km || 
|}

181601–181700 

|-bgcolor=#E9E9E9
| 181601 ||  || — || November 16, 2006 || Kitt Peak || Spacewatch || — || align=right | 3.1 km || 
|-id=602 bgcolor=#fefefe
| 181602 ||  || — || November 16, 2006 || Kitt Peak || Spacewatch || — || align=right data-sort-value="0.98" | 980 m || 
|-id=603 bgcolor=#E9E9E9
| 181603 ||  || — || November 16, 2006 || Kitt Peak || Spacewatch || — || align=right | 2.3 km || 
|-id=604 bgcolor=#fefefe
| 181604 ||  || — || November 16, 2006 || Mount Lemmon || Mount Lemmon Survey || — || align=right data-sort-value="0.94" | 940 m || 
|-id=605 bgcolor=#d6d6d6
| 181605 ||  || — || November 16, 2006 || Mount Lemmon || Mount Lemmon Survey || — || align=right | 4.0 km || 
|-id=606 bgcolor=#E9E9E9
| 181606 ||  || — || November 16, 2006 || Kitt Peak || Spacewatch || — || align=right | 2.0 km || 
|-id=607 bgcolor=#d6d6d6
| 181607 ||  || — || November 17, 2006 || Socorro || LINEAR || — || align=right | 4.1 km || 
|-id=608 bgcolor=#E9E9E9
| 181608 ||  || — || November 19, 2006 || Kitt Peak || Spacewatch || — || align=right | 3.3 km || 
|-id=609 bgcolor=#d6d6d6
| 181609 ||  || — || November 19, 2006 || Kitt Peak || Spacewatch || THM || align=right | 2.7 km || 
|-id=610 bgcolor=#d6d6d6
| 181610 ||  || — || November 19, 2006 || Socorro || LINEAR || — || align=right | 4.0 km || 
|-id=611 bgcolor=#E9E9E9
| 181611 ||  || — || November 19, 2006 || Kitt Peak || Spacewatch || — || align=right | 1.0 km || 
|-id=612 bgcolor=#E9E9E9
| 181612 ||  || — || November 19, 2006 || Kitt Peak || Spacewatch || AGN || align=right | 1.8 km || 
|-id=613 bgcolor=#fefefe
| 181613 ||  || — || November 19, 2006 || Kitt Peak || Spacewatch || NYS || align=right | 1.2 km || 
|-id=614 bgcolor=#E9E9E9
| 181614 ||  || — || November 19, 2006 || Kitt Peak || Spacewatch || AST || align=right | 3.2 km || 
|-id=615 bgcolor=#E9E9E9
| 181615 ||  || — || November 20, 2006 || Kitt Peak || Spacewatch || — || align=right | 1.8 km || 
|-id=616 bgcolor=#E9E9E9
| 181616 ||  || — || November 25, 2006 || Goodricke-Pigott || R. A. Tucker || — || align=right | 1.7 km || 
|-id=617 bgcolor=#d6d6d6
| 181617 ||  || — || November 20, 2006 || Kitt Peak || Spacewatch || — || align=right | 3.8 km || 
|-id=618 bgcolor=#d6d6d6
| 181618 ||  || — || November 20, 2006 || Kitt Peak || Spacewatch || 3:2 || align=right | 4.5 km || 
|-id=619 bgcolor=#E9E9E9
| 181619 ||  || — || November 23, 2006 || Kitt Peak || Spacewatch || — || align=right | 1.4 km || 
|-id=620 bgcolor=#E9E9E9
| 181620 ||  || — || November 23, 2006 || Kitt Peak || Spacewatch || AGN || align=right | 1.4 km || 
|-id=621 bgcolor=#E9E9E9
| 181621 ||  || — || November 23, 2006 || Kitt Peak || Spacewatch || HEN || align=right | 1.6 km || 
|-id=622 bgcolor=#d6d6d6
| 181622 ||  || — || November 17, 2006 || Palomar || NEAT || EOS || align=right | 2.6 km || 
|-id=623 bgcolor=#d6d6d6
| 181623 ||  || — || November 25, 2006 || Mount Lemmon || Mount Lemmon Survey || — || align=right | 4.3 km || 
|-id=624 bgcolor=#fefefe
| 181624 ||  || — || November 27, 2006 || Catalina || CSS || — || align=right | 1.3 km || 
|-id=625 bgcolor=#d6d6d6
| 181625 ||  || — || November 27, 2006 || Kitt Peak || Spacewatch || — || align=right | 3.7 km || 
|-id=626 bgcolor=#d6d6d6
| 181626 ||  || — || December 8, 2006 || Palomar || NEAT || — || align=right | 4.7 km || 
|-id=627 bgcolor=#fefefe
| 181627 Philgeluck ||  ||  || December 8, 2006 || Tenagra II || J.-C. Merlin || — || align=right | 1.1 km || 
|-id=628 bgcolor=#d6d6d6
| 181628 ||  || — || December 9, 2006 || Kitt Peak || Spacewatch || — || align=right | 4.1 km || 
|-id=629 bgcolor=#d6d6d6
| 181629 ||  || — || December 9, 2006 || Kitt Peak || Spacewatch || — || align=right | 5.4 km || 
|-id=630 bgcolor=#fefefe
| 181630 ||  || — || December 9, 2006 || Kitt Peak || Spacewatch || — || align=right | 1.6 km || 
|-id=631 bgcolor=#d6d6d6
| 181631 ||  || — || December 10, 2006 || Kitt Peak || Spacewatch || — || align=right | 2.8 km || 
|-id=632 bgcolor=#d6d6d6
| 181632 ||  || — || December 10, 2006 || Kitt Peak || Spacewatch || KOR || align=right | 2.0 km || 
|-id=633 bgcolor=#d6d6d6
| 181633 ||  || — || December 10, 2006 || Kitt Peak || Spacewatch || SHU3:2 || align=right | 6.6 km || 
|-id=634 bgcolor=#E9E9E9
| 181634 ||  || — || December 11, 2006 || Catalina || CSS || — || align=right | 1.9 km || 
|-id=635 bgcolor=#E9E9E9
| 181635 ||  || — || December 12, 2006 || Kitt Peak || Spacewatch || — || align=right | 3.8 km || 
|-id=636 bgcolor=#d6d6d6
| 181636 ||  || — || December 12, 2006 || Mount Lemmon || Mount Lemmon Survey || — || align=right | 3.9 km || 
|-id=637 bgcolor=#d6d6d6
| 181637 ||  || — || December 12, 2006 || Catalina || CSS || — || align=right | 3.8 km || 
|-id=638 bgcolor=#E9E9E9
| 181638 ||  || — || December 11, 2006 || Kitt Peak || Spacewatch || WIT || align=right | 1.2 km || 
|-id=639 bgcolor=#E9E9E9
| 181639 ||  || — || December 12, 2006 || Kitt Peak || Spacewatch || NEM || align=right | 2.7 km || 
|-id=640 bgcolor=#d6d6d6
| 181640 ||  || — || December 13, 2006 || Socorro || LINEAR || EOS || align=right | 3.0 km || 
|-id=641 bgcolor=#d6d6d6
| 181641 ||  || — || December 13, 2006 || Kitt Peak || Spacewatch || — || align=right | 4.5 km || 
|-id=642 bgcolor=#d6d6d6
| 181642 ||  || — || December 12, 2006 || Palomar || NEAT || HYG || align=right | 3.8 km || 
|-id=643 bgcolor=#d6d6d6
| 181643 ||  || — || December 17, 2006 || Mount Lemmon || Mount Lemmon Survey || — || align=right | 4.2 km || 
|-id=644 bgcolor=#d6d6d6
| 181644 ||  || — || December 20, 2006 || Palomar || NEAT || — || align=right | 7.3 km || 
|-id=645 bgcolor=#d6d6d6
| 181645 ||  || — || December 22, 2006 || Socorro || LINEAR || — || align=right | 3.9 km || 
|-id=646 bgcolor=#d6d6d6
| 181646 ||  || — || January 10, 2007 || Kitt Peak || Spacewatch || EOS || align=right | 3.4 km || 
|-id=647 bgcolor=#d6d6d6
| 181647 ||  || — || February 9, 2007 || Kitt Peak || Spacewatch || 3:2 || align=right | 5.0 km || 
|-id=648 bgcolor=#C2FFFF
| 181648 ||  || — || March 6, 2007 || Palomar || NEAT || L5 || align=right | 12 km || 
|-id=649 bgcolor=#fefefe
| 181649 ||  || — || October 11, 2007 || Kitt Peak || Spacewatch || MAS || align=right | 1.1 km || 
|-id=650 bgcolor=#E9E9E9
| 181650 ||  || — || October 16, 2007 || Catalina || CSS || — || align=right | 3.7 km || 
|-id=651 bgcolor=#E9E9E9
| 181651 ||  || — || October 30, 2007 || Mount Lemmon || Mount Lemmon Survey || HOF || align=right | 3.9 km || 
|-id=652 bgcolor=#d6d6d6
| 181652 ||  || — || November 2, 2007 || Catalina || CSS || — || align=right | 4.6 km || 
|-id=653 bgcolor=#E9E9E9
| 181653 ||  || — || November 2, 2007 || Kitt Peak || Spacewatch || — || align=right | 3.1 km || 
|-id=654 bgcolor=#E9E9E9
| 181654 ||  || — || November 5, 2007 || Kitt Peak || Spacewatch || — || align=right | 1.6 km || 
|-id=655 bgcolor=#fefefe
| 181655 ||  || — || November 14, 2007 || RAS || A. Lowe || — || align=right | 1.1 km || 
|-id=656 bgcolor=#E9E9E9
| 181656 ||  || — || November 7, 2007 || Kitt Peak || Spacewatch || — || align=right | 2.5 km || 
|-id=657 bgcolor=#d6d6d6
| 181657 ||  || — || November 13, 2007 || Kitt Peak || Spacewatch || — || align=right | 4.4 km || 
|-id=658 bgcolor=#E9E9E9
| 181658 ||  || — || November 12, 2007 || Socorro || LINEAR || — || align=right | 1.4 km || 
|-id=659 bgcolor=#d6d6d6
| 181659 ||  || — || December 3, 2007 || Catalina || CSS || KOR || align=right | 1.9 km || 
|-id=660 bgcolor=#fefefe
| 181660 ||  || — || December 30, 2007 || Mount Lemmon || Mount Lemmon Survey || — || align=right data-sort-value="0.74" | 740 m || 
|-id=661 bgcolor=#d6d6d6
| 181661 Alessandro ||  ||  || December 29, 2007 || Suno || Suno Obs. || EOS || align=right | 2.8 km || 
|-id=662 bgcolor=#d6d6d6
| 181662 ||  || — || December 31, 2007 || Catalina || CSS || — || align=right | 3.8 km || 
|-id=663 bgcolor=#fefefe
| 181663 ||  || — || January 7, 2008 || Lulin Observatory || LUSS || V || align=right | 1.2 km || 
|-id=664 bgcolor=#fefefe
| 181664 ||  || — || January 10, 2008 || Kitt Peak || Spacewatch || — || align=right | 1.1 km || 
|-id=665 bgcolor=#C2FFFF
| 181665 ||  || — || January 12, 2008 || Mount Lemmon || Mount Lemmon Survey || L5 || align=right | 15 km || 
|-id=666 bgcolor=#E9E9E9
| 181666 ||  || — || January 13, 2008 || Socorro || LINEAR || — || align=right | 3.0 km || 
|-id=667 bgcolor=#E9E9E9
| 181667 ||  || — || January 10, 2008 || Catalina || CSS || — || align=right | 1.5 km || 
|-id=668 bgcolor=#fefefe
| 181668 ||  || — || January 10, 2008 || Kitt Peak || Spacewatch || MAS || align=right | 1.3 km || 
|-id=669 bgcolor=#E9E9E9
| 181669 ||  || — || January 11, 2008 || Kitt Peak || Spacewatch || — || align=right | 3.7 km || 
|-id=670 bgcolor=#d6d6d6
| 181670 Kengyun ||  ||  || January 28, 2008 || Lulin Observatory || C.-S. Lin, Q.-z. Ye || — || align=right | 5.6 km || 
|-id=671 bgcolor=#E9E9E9
| 181671 ||  || — || January 31, 2008 || Mount Lemmon || Mount Lemmon Survey || — || align=right | 3.0 km || 
|-id=672 bgcolor=#fefefe
| 181672 ||  || — || January 31, 2008 || Mount Lemmon || Mount Lemmon Survey || — || align=right | 1.0 km || 
|-id=673 bgcolor=#d6d6d6
| 181673 ||  || — || January 30, 2008 || Catalina || CSS || — || align=right | 4.6 km || 
|-id=674 bgcolor=#fefefe
| 181674 ||  || — || February 7, 2008 || Kitt Peak || Spacewatch || FLO || align=right data-sort-value="0.80" | 800 m || 
|-id=675 bgcolor=#d6d6d6
| 181675 ||  || — || February 9, 2008 || RAS || A. Lowe || HIL3:2 || align=right | 11 km || 
|-id=676 bgcolor=#E9E9E9
| 181676 || 2213 P-L || — || October 22, 1960 || Palomar || PLS || — || align=right | 1.2 km || 
|-id=677 bgcolor=#fefefe
| 181677 || 2617 P-L || — || September 24, 1960 || Palomar || PLS || — || align=right | 1.1 km || 
|-id=678 bgcolor=#fefefe
| 181678 || 2667 P-L || — || September 24, 1960 || Palomar || PLS || NYS || align=right data-sort-value="0.90" | 900 m || 
|-id=679 bgcolor=#fefefe
| 181679 || 2724 P-L || — || September 24, 1960 || Palomar || PLS || — || align=right | 1.2 km || 
|-id=680 bgcolor=#fefefe
| 181680 || 4290 P-L || — || September 24, 1960 || Palomar || PLS || FLO || align=right data-sort-value="0.83" | 830 m || 
|-id=681 bgcolor=#E9E9E9
| 181681 || 4746 P-L || — || September 24, 1960 || Palomar || PLS || — || align=right | 1.5 km || 
|-id=682 bgcolor=#E9E9E9
| 181682 || 4786 P-L || — || September 24, 1960 || Palomar || PLS || — || align=right | 1.6 km || 
|-id=683 bgcolor=#fefefe
| 181683 || 4803 P-L || — || September 24, 1960 || Palomar || PLS || MAS || align=right | 1.0 km || 
|-id=684 bgcolor=#E9E9E9
| 181684 || 6330 P-L || — || September 24, 1960 || Palomar || PLS || — || align=right | 1.6 km || 
|-id=685 bgcolor=#fefefe
| 181685 || 6645 P-L || — || September 27, 1960 || Palomar || PLS || — || align=right | 1.7 km || 
|-id=686 bgcolor=#E9E9E9
| 181686 || 6712 P-L || — || September 26, 1960 || Palomar || PLS || — || align=right | 2.1 km || 
|-id=687 bgcolor=#FA8072
| 181687 || 9568 P-L || — || October 22, 1960 || Palomar || PLS || — || align=right | 2.2 km || 
|-id=688 bgcolor=#fefefe
| 181688 || 2331 T-2 || — || September 30, 1973 || Palomar || PLS || — || align=right data-sort-value="0.90" | 900 m || 
|-id=689 bgcolor=#d6d6d6
| 181689 || 3093 T-2 || — || September 30, 1973 || Palomar || PLS || EOS || align=right | 3.5 km || 
|-id=690 bgcolor=#E9E9E9
| 181690 || 3174 T-2 || — || September 30, 1973 || Palomar || PLS || — || align=right | 1.3 km || 
|-id=691 bgcolor=#E9E9E9
| 181691 || 4089 T-2 || — || September 29, 1973 || Palomar || PLS || — || align=right | 1.6 km || 
|-id=692 bgcolor=#fefefe
| 181692 || 4621 T-2 || — || September 30, 1973 || Palomar || PLS || — || align=right | 1.5 km || 
|-id=693 bgcolor=#E9E9E9
| 181693 || 5096 T-2 || — || September 25, 1973 || Palomar || PLS || — || align=right | 2.1 km || 
|-id=694 bgcolor=#d6d6d6
| 181694 || 1049 T-3 || — || October 17, 1977 || Palomar || PLS || BRA || align=right | 1.9 km || 
|-id=695 bgcolor=#E9E9E9
| 181695 || 3007 T-3 || — || October 16, 1977 || Palomar || PLS || — || align=right | 1.7 km || 
|-id=696 bgcolor=#fefefe
| 181696 || 3113 T-3 || — || October 16, 1977 || Palomar || PLS || — || align=right | 1.5 km || 
|-id=697 bgcolor=#d6d6d6
| 181697 || 5185 T-3 || — || October 16, 1977 || Palomar || PLS || — || align=right | 6.9 km || 
|-id=698 bgcolor=#FA8072
| 181698 || 5684 T-3 || — || October 16, 1977 || Palomar || PLS || — || align=right | 1.1 km || 
|-id=699 bgcolor=#d6d6d6
| 181699 || 5701 T-3 || — || October 16, 1977 || Palomar || PLS || — || align=right | 3.9 km || 
|-id=700 bgcolor=#E9E9E9
| 181700 ||  || — || March 2, 1981 || Siding Spring || S. J. Bus || — || align=right | 3.8 km || 
|}

181701–181800 

|-bgcolor=#E9E9E9
| 181701 ||  || — || March 2, 1981 || Siding Spring || S. J. Bus || — || align=right | 3.1 km || 
|-id=702 bgcolor=#fefefe
| 181702 Forcalquier ||  ||  || September 15, 1988 || Haute Provence || E. W. Elst || ERI || align=right | 2.4 km || 
|-id=703 bgcolor=#d6d6d6
| 181703 || 1988 TS || — || October 13, 1988 || Kushiro || S. Ueda, H. Kaneda || — || align=right | 6.6 km || 
|-id=704 bgcolor=#FA8072
| 181704 || 1989 NA || — || July 2, 1989 || Palomar || E. F. Helin || — || align=right | 1.6 km || 
|-id=705 bgcolor=#E9E9E9
| 181705 || 1989 RY || — || September 3, 1989 || Haute Provence || E. W. Elst || — || align=right | 2.2 km || 
|-id=706 bgcolor=#fefefe
| 181706 ||  || — || October 31, 1991 || Kushiro || S. Ueda, H. Kaneda || — || align=right | 2.2 km || 
|-id=707 bgcolor=#d6d6d6
| 181707 ||  || — || March 1, 1992 || La Silla || UESAC || — || align=right | 5.6 km || 
|-id=708 bgcolor=#C2E0FF
| 181708 || 1993 FW || — || March 28, 1993 || Mauna Kea || D. C. Jewitt, J. X. Luu || cubewano (hot) || align=right | 186 km || 
|-id=709 bgcolor=#d6d6d6
| 181709 ||  || — || March 19, 1993 || La Silla || UESAC || 628 || align=right | 2.8 km || 
|-id=710 bgcolor=#E9E9E9
| 181710 ||  || — || September 17, 1993 || La Silla || E. W. Elst || — || align=right | 1.7 km || 
|-id=711 bgcolor=#E9E9E9
| 181711 ||  || — || September 22, 1993 || La Silla || H. Debehogne, E. W. Elst || — || align=right | 1.4 km || 
|-id=712 bgcolor=#E9E9E9
| 181712 ||  || — || October 9, 1993 || La Silla || E. W. Elst || GER || align=right | 4.0 km || 
|-id=713 bgcolor=#E9E9E9
| 181713 ||  || — || October 9, 1993 || La Silla || E. W. Elst || — || align=right | 2.0 km || 
|-id=714 bgcolor=#d6d6d6
| 181714 ||  || — || October 9, 1993 || La Silla || E. W. Elst || — || align=right | 4.7 km || 
|-id=715 bgcolor=#fefefe
| 181715 ||  || — || October 9, 1993 || La Silla || E. W. Elst || — || align=right | 2.6 km || 
|-id=716 bgcolor=#E9E9E9
| 181716 ||  || — || January 18, 1994 || Kitt Peak || Spacewatch || — || align=right | 2.6 km || 
|-id=717 bgcolor=#d6d6d6
| 181717 ||  || — || April 6, 1994 || Kitt Peak || Spacewatch || — || align=right | 4.3 km || 
|-id=718 bgcolor=#E9E9E9
| 181718 ||  || — || September 28, 1994 || Kitt Peak || Spacewatch || — || align=right | 1.3 km || 
|-id=719 bgcolor=#E9E9E9
| 181719 ||  || — || October 26, 1994 || Kitt Peak || Spacewatch || — || align=right data-sort-value="0.87" | 870 m || 
|-id=720 bgcolor=#E9E9E9
| 181720 ||  || — || December 31, 1994 || Kitt Peak || Spacewatch || — || align=right | 2.7 km || 
|-id=721 bgcolor=#fefefe
| 181721 ||  || — || January 29, 1995 || Kitt Peak || Spacewatch || — || align=right data-sort-value="0.84" | 840 m || 
|-id=722 bgcolor=#E9E9E9
| 181722 || 1995 CU || — || February 1, 1995 || San Marcello || A. Boattini, L. Tesi || — || align=right | 1.6 km || 
|-id=723 bgcolor=#E9E9E9
| 181723 ||  || — || February 24, 1995 || Kitt Peak || Spacewatch || — || align=right | 1.6 km || 
|-id=724 bgcolor=#fefefe
| 181724 ||  || — || March 27, 1995 || Kitt Peak || Spacewatch || — || align=right | 1.00 km || 
|-id=725 bgcolor=#E9E9E9
| 181725 ||  || — || March 31, 1995 || Kitt Peak || Spacewatch || JUN || align=right | 1.8 km || 
|-id=726 bgcolor=#E9E9E9
| 181726 ||  || — || June 29, 1995 || Kitt Peak || Spacewatch || — || align=right | 2.7 km || 
|-id=727 bgcolor=#d6d6d6
| 181727 ||  || — || August 25, 1995 || Kitt Peak || Spacewatch || AEG || align=right | 4.0 km || 
|-id=728 bgcolor=#fefefe
| 181728 ||  || — || September 17, 1995 || Kitt Peak || Spacewatch || V || align=right | 1.0 km || 
|-id=729 bgcolor=#d6d6d6
| 181729 ||  || — || September 18, 1995 || Kitt Peak || Spacewatch || — || align=right | 4.9 km || 
|-id=730 bgcolor=#d6d6d6
| 181730 ||  || — || September 22, 1995 || Kitt Peak || Spacewatch || — || align=right | 2.3 km || 
|-id=731 bgcolor=#d6d6d6
| 181731 ||  || — || September 24, 1995 || Kitt Peak || Spacewatch || — || align=right | 3.1 km || 
|-id=732 bgcolor=#d6d6d6
| 181732 ||  || — || September 18, 1995 || Kitt Peak || Spacewatch || — || align=right | 4.6 km || 
|-id=733 bgcolor=#fefefe
| 181733 ||  || — || October 15, 1995 || Kitt Peak || Spacewatch || — || align=right data-sort-value="0.94" | 940 m || 
|-id=734 bgcolor=#fefefe
| 181734 ||  || — || October 23, 1995 || San Marcello || L. Tesi, A. Boattini || — || align=right | 1.2 km || 
|-id=735 bgcolor=#fefefe
| 181735 ||  || — || October 17, 1995 || Kitt Peak || Spacewatch || NYS || align=right data-sort-value="0.83" | 830 m || 
|-id=736 bgcolor=#d6d6d6
| 181736 ||  || — || October 19, 1995 || Kitt Peak || Spacewatch || — || align=right | 3.9 km || 
|-id=737 bgcolor=#fefefe
| 181737 ||  || — || October 25, 1995 || Kitt Peak || Spacewatch || NYS || align=right data-sort-value="0.82" | 820 m || 
|-id=738 bgcolor=#d6d6d6
| 181738 ||  || — || October 17, 1995 || Kitt Peak || Spacewatch || KOR || align=right | 1.5 km || 
|-id=739 bgcolor=#d6d6d6
| 181739 ||  || — || October 23, 1995 || Kitt Peak || Spacewatch || — || align=right | 3.4 km || 
|-id=740 bgcolor=#d6d6d6
| 181740 ||  || — || November 14, 1995 || Kitt Peak || Spacewatch || — || align=right | 3.3 km || 
|-id=741 bgcolor=#d6d6d6
| 181741 ||  || — || November 15, 1995 || Kitt Peak || Spacewatch || — || align=right | 3.2 km || 
|-id=742 bgcolor=#d6d6d6
| 181742 ||  || — || November 17, 1995 || Kitt Peak || Spacewatch || — || align=right | 3.2 km || 
|-id=743 bgcolor=#d6d6d6
| 181743 ||  || — || December 14, 1995 || Kitt Peak || Spacewatch || 637 || align=right | 2.5 km || 
|-id=744 bgcolor=#fefefe
| 181744 ||  || — || December 18, 1995 || Kitt Peak || Spacewatch || — || align=right data-sort-value="0.92" | 920 m || 
|-id=745 bgcolor=#fefefe
| 181745 ||  || — || December 22, 1995 || Kitt Peak || Spacewatch || — || align=right | 1.3 km || 
|-id=746 bgcolor=#fefefe
| 181746 ||  || — || January 13, 1996 || Kitt Peak || Spacewatch || NYS || align=right data-sort-value="0.88" | 880 m || 
|-id=747 bgcolor=#d6d6d6
| 181747 ||  || — || January 16, 1996 || Kitt Peak || Spacewatch || HYG || align=right | 5.3 km || 
|-id=748 bgcolor=#fefefe
| 181748 ||  || — || February 26, 1996 || Siding Spring || R. H. McNaught || H || align=right | 1.1 km || 
|-id=749 bgcolor=#d6d6d6
| 181749 ||  || — || March 12, 1996 || Kitt Peak || Spacewatch || HYG || align=right | 3.5 km || 
|-id=750 bgcolor=#E9E9E9
| 181750 ||  || — || March 19, 1996 || Kitt Peak || Spacewatch || — || align=right | 1.9 km || 
|-id=751 bgcolor=#C2FFFF
| 181751 Phaenops ||  ||  || April 17, 1996 || La Silla || E. W. Elst || L5 || align=right | 15 km || 
|-id=752 bgcolor=#E9E9E9
| 181752 ||  || — || May 11, 1996 || Kitt Peak || Spacewatch || — || align=right | 1.1 km || 
|-id=753 bgcolor=#E9E9E9
| 181753 ||  || — || September 7, 1996 || Kitt Peak || Spacewatch || — || align=right | 3.0 km || 
|-id=754 bgcolor=#E9E9E9
| 181754 ||  || — || September 13, 1996 || Haleakala || NEAT || — || align=right | 2.9 km || 
|-id=755 bgcolor=#E9E9E9
| 181755 ||  || — || October 4, 1996 || Kitt Peak || Spacewatch || MRX || align=right | 1.4 km || 
|-id=756 bgcolor=#E9E9E9
| 181756 ||  || — || October 7, 1996 || Kitt Peak || Spacewatch || AGN || align=right | 1.9 km || 
|-id=757 bgcolor=#E9E9E9
| 181757 ||  || — || October 7, 1996 || Kitt Peak || Spacewatch || — || align=right | 2.7 km || 
|-id=758 bgcolor=#E9E9E9
| 181758 ||  || — || October 10, 1996 || Kitt Peak || Spacewatch || — || align=right | 3.1 km || 
|-id=759 bgcolor=#fefefe
| 181759 ||  || — || October 4, 1996 || La Silla || E. W. Elst || — || align=right | 1.1 km || 
|-id=760 bgcolor=#d6d6d6
| 181760 ||  || — || October 7, 1996 || Kitt Peak || Spacewatch || KOR || align=right | 2.1 km || 
|-id=761 bgcolor=#E9E9E9
| 181761 ||  || — || November 10, 1996 || Sudbury || D. di Cicco || — || align=right | 4.2 km || 
|-id=762 bgcolor=#fefefe
| 181762 ||  || — || November 6, 1996 || Kitt Peak || Spacewatch || — || align=right data-sort-value="0.78" | 780 m || 
|-id=763 bgcolor=#fefefe
| 181763 ||  || — || November 10, 1996 || Kitt Peak || Spacewatch || MAS || align=right | 1.00 km || 
|-id=764 bgcolor=#d6d6d6
| 181764 ||  || — || November 10, 1996 || Kitt Peak || Spacewatch || — || align=right | 3.7 km || 
|-id=765 bgcolor=#d6d6d6
| 181765 ||  || — || December 1, 1996 || Kitt Peak || Spacewatch || — || align=right | 2.9 km || 
|-id=766 bgcolor=#fefefe
| 181766 ||  || — || January 12, 1997 || Kleť || Kleť Obs. || — || align=right | 1.0 km || 
|-id=767 bgcolor=#d6d6d6
| 181767 ||  || — || February 1, 1997 || Kitt Peak || Spacewatch || — || align=right | 4.4 km || 
|-id=768 bgcolor=#d6d6d6
| 181768 ||  || — || February 6, 1997 || Kitt Peak || Spacewatch || THM || align=right | 2.7 km || 
|-id=769 bgcolor=#d6d6d6
| 181769 ||  || — || February 13, 1997 || Kitt Peak || Spacewatch || — || align=right | 3.0 km || 
|-id=770 bgcolor=#fefefe
| 181770 ||  || — || March 10, 1997 || La Silla || E. W. Elst || — || align=right | 1.1 km || 
|-id=771 bgcolor=#FA8072
| 181771 ||  || — || April 5, 1997 || Haleakala || NEAT || — || align=right | 1.6 km || 
|-id=772 bgcolor=#E9E9E9
| 181772 ||  || — || June 6, 1997 || Mauna Kea || C. Veillet || EUN || align=right | 1.6 km || 
|-id=773 bgcolor=#C2FFFF
| 181773 ||  || — || June 2, 1997 || Kitt Peak || Spacewatch || L5 || align=right | 11 km || 
|-id=774 bgcolor=#d6d6d6
| 181774 ||  || — || June 7, 1997 || La Silla || E. W. Elst || — || align=right | 7.2 km || 
|-id=775 bgcolor=#E9E9E9
| 181775 ||  || — || October 3, 1997 || Caussols || ODAS || — || align=right | 1.6 km || 
|-id=776 bgcolor=#E9E9E9
| 181776 ||  || — || October 2, 1997 || Caussols || ODAS || — || align=right | 1.9 km || 
|-id=777 bgcolor=#E9E9E9
| 181777 ||  || — || October 2, 1997 || Kitt Peak || Spacewatch || NEM || align=right | 2.6 km || 
|-id=778 bgcolor=#d6d6d6
| 181778 ||  || — || October 21, 1997 || Kitt Peak || Spacewatch || HIL3:2 || align=right | 7.9 km || 
|-id=779 bgcolor=#E9E9E9
| 181779 ||  || — || October 28, 1997 || Kitt Peak || Spacewatch || ADE || align=right | 3.3 km || 
|-id=780 bgcolor=#fefefe
| 181780 ||  || — || November 23, 1997 || Kitt Peak || Spacewatch || — || align=right data-sort-value="0.87" | 870 m || 
|-id=781 bgcolor=#E9E9E9
| 181781 ||  || — || December 23, 1997 || Xinglong || SCAP || — || align=right | 3.6 km || 
|-id=782 bgcolor=#fefefe
| 181782 ||  || — || January 2, 1998 || Kitt Peak || Spacewatch || — || align=right | 1.4 km || 
|-id=783 bgcolor=#fefefe
| 181783 ||  || — || January 25, 1998 || Modra || A. Galád || — || align=right | 1.4 km || 
|-id=784 bgcolor=#fefefe
| 181784 ||  || — || January 22, 1998 || Kitt Peak || Spacewatch || — || align=right | 1.2 km || 
|-id=785 bgcolor=#d6d6d6
| 181785 ||  || — || January 25, 1998 || Kitt Peak || Spacewatch || — || align=right | 3.7 km || 
|-id=786 bgcolor=#fefefe
| 181786 ||  || — || January 29, 1998 || Kitt Peak || Spacewatch || — || align=right | 1.1 km || 
|-id=787 bgcolor=#E9E9E9
| 181787 ||  || — || February 23, 1998 || Kitt Peak || Spacewatch || — || align=right | 3.4 km || 
|-id=788 bgcolor=#fefefe
| 181788 ||  || — || February 23, 1998 || Kitt Peak || Spacewatch || — || align=right data-sort-value="0.92" | 920 m || 
|-id=789 bgcolor=#E9E9E9
| 181789 ||  || — || February 24, 1998 || Kitt Peak || Spacewatch || AGN || align=right | 1.9 km || 
|-id=790 bgcolor=#d6d6d6
| 181790 ||  || — || February 23, 1998 || Kitt Peak || Spacewatch || KAR || align=right | 1.9 km || 
|-id=791 bgcolor=#fefefe
| 181791 ||  || — || March 8, 1998 || Xinglong || SCAP || FLO || align=right data-sort-value="0.92" | 920 m || 
|-id=792 bgcolor=#d6d6d6
| 181792 ||  || — || March 20, 1998 || Socorro || LINEAR || — || align=right | 2.9 km || 
|-id=793 bgcolor=#fefefe
| 181793 ||  || — || April 18, 1998 || Kitt Peak || Spacewatch || — || align=right | 1.2 km || 
|-id=794 bgcolor=#d6d6d6
| 181794 ||  || — || April 22, 1998 || Kitt Peak || Spacewatch || HYG || align=right | 3.3 km || 
|-id=795 bgcolor=#fefefe
| 181795 ||  || — || April 21, 1998 || Socorro || LINEAR || — || align=right | 1.2 km || 
|-id=796 bgcolor=#fefefe
| 181796 ||  || — || April 23, 1998 || Socorro || LINEAR || — || align=right | 1.3 km || 
|-id=797 bgcolor=#FA8072
| 181797 ||  || — || June 19, 1998 || Socorro || LINEAR || — || align=right | 2.8 km || 
|-id=798 bgcolor=#E9E9E9
| 181798 ||  || — || June 26, 1998 || La Silla || E. W. Elst || — || align=right | 2.1 km || 
|-id=799 bgcolor=#fefefe
| 181799 ||  || — || July 24, 1998 || Caussols || ODAS || NYS || align=right | 1.1 km || 
|-id=800 bgcolor=#d6d6d6
| 181800 ||  || — || August 22, 1998 || Xinglong || SCAP || — || align=right | 5.2 km || 
|}

181801–181900 

|-bgcolor=#fefefe
| 181801 ||  || — || August 17, 1998 || Socorro || LINEAR || NYS || align=right data-sort-value="0.99" | 990 m || 
|-id=802 bgcolor=#d6d6d6
| 181802 ||  || — || August 26, 1998 || Kitt Peak || Spacewatch || — || align=right | 5.1 km || 
|-id=803 bgcolor=#d6d6d6
| 181803 ||  || — || August 24, 1998 || Socorro || LINEAR || MEL || align=right | 7.4 km || 
|-id=804 bgcolor=#d6d6d6
| 181804 ||  || — || August 24, 1998 || Socorro || LINEAR || TIR || align=right | 5.0 km || 
|-id=805 bgcolor=#d6d6d6
| 181805 ||  || — || August 24, 1998 || Socorro || LINEAR || MEL || align=right | 7.1 km || 
|-id=806 bgcolor=#fefefe
| 181806 ||  || — || August 19, 1998 || Socorro || LINEAR || — || align=right | 1.3 km || 
|-id=807 bgcolor=#d6d6d6
| 181807 ||  || — || August 19, 1998 || Socorro || LINEAR || — || align=right | 5.8 km || 
|-id=808 bgcolor=#fefefe
| 181808 ||  || — || August 25, 1998 || La Silla || E. W. Elst || NYS || align=right | 2.2 km || 
|-id=809 bgcolor=#fefefe
| 181809 ||  || — || September 14, 1998 || Socorro || LINEAR || — || align=right | 1.5 km || 
|-id=810 bgcolor=#fefefe
| 181810 ||  || — || September 14, 1998 || Kitt Peak || Spacewatch || — || align=right data-sort-value="0.92" | 920 m || 
|-id=811 bgcolor=#E9E9E9
| 181811 ||  || — || September 14, 1998 || Kitt Peak || Spacewatch || — || align=right | 1.0 km || 
|-id=812 bgcolor=#fefefe
| 181812 ||  || — || September 14, 1998 || Socorro || LINEAR || NYS || align=right data-sort-value="0.89" | 890 m || 
|-id=813 bgcolor=#fefefe
| 181813 ||  || — || September 14, 1998 || Socorro || LINEAR || V || align=right | 1.0 km || 
|-id=814 bgcolor=#fefefe
| 181814 ||  || — || September 14, 1998 || Socorro || LINEAR || V || align=right | 1.3 km || 
|-id=815 bgcolor=#fefefe
| 181815 ||  || — || September 14, 1998 || Socorro || LINEAR || — || align=right | 1.5 km || 
|-id=816 bgcolor=#fefefe
| 181816 ||  || — || September 14, 1998 || Socorro || LINEAR || V || align=right | 1.1 km || 
|-id=817 bgcolor=#E9E9E9
| 181817 ||  || — || September 14, 1998 || Socorro || LINEAR || — || align=right | 2.7 km || 
|-id=818 bgcolor=#fefefe
| 181818 ||  || — || September 14, 1998 || Socorro || LINEAR || — || align=right | 1.4 km || 
|-id=819 bgcolor=#fefefe
| 181819 ||  || — || September 14, 1998 || Socorro || LINEAR || — || align=right | 3.9 km || 
|-id=820 bgcolor=#fefefe
| 181820 ||  || — || September 18, 1998 || Caussols || ODAS || H || align=right data-sort-value="0.95" | 950 m || 
|-id=821 bgcolor=#fefefe
| 181821 ||  || — || September 20, 1998 || Kitt Peak || Spacewatch || SUL || align=right | 2.7 km || 
|-id=822 bgcolor=#fefefe
| 181822 ||  || — || September 17, 1998 || Xinglong || SCAP || — || align=right | 1.6 km || 
|-id=823 bgcolor=#fefefe
| 181823 ||  || — || September 21, 1998 || Višnjan Observatory || Višnjan Obs. || — || align=right | 1.5 km || 
|-id=824 bgcolor=#fefefe
| 181824 Königsleiten ||  ||  || September 24, 1998 || Drebach || G. Lehmann, J. Kandler || NYS || align=right | 1.0 km || 
|-id=825 bgcolor=#d6d6d6
| 181825 ||  || — || September 23, 1998 || Kitt Peak || Spacewatch || — || align=right | 5.4 km || 
|-id=826 bgcolor=#FA8072
| 181826 ||  || — || September 22, 1998 || Bergisch Gladbach || W. Bickel || — || align=right | 1.2 km || 
|-id=827 bgcolor=#fefefe
| 181827 ||  || — || September 26, 1998 || Kitt Peak || Spacewatch || NYS || align=right | 1.0 km || 
|-id=828 bgcolor=#fefefe
| 181828 ||  || — || September 17, 1998 || Anderson Mesa || LONEOS || — || align=right | 1.4 km || 
|-id=829 bgcolor=#fefefe
| 181829 Houyunde ||  ||  || September 25, 1998 || Xinglong || SCAP || V || align=right | 1.1 km || 
|-id=830 bgcolor=#fefefe
| 181830 ||  || — || September 26, 1998 || Socorro || LINEAR || — || align=right | 2.1 km || 
|-id=831 bgcolor=#d6d6d6
| 181831 ||  || — || September 26, 1998 || Socorro || LINEAR || — || align=right | 4.5 km || 
|-id=832 bgcolor=#fefefe
| 181832 ||  || — || September 26, 1998 || Socorro || LINEAR || — || align=right | 1.4 km || 
|-id=833 bgcolor=#fefefe
| 181833 ||  || — || September 26, 1998 || Socorro || LINEAR || — || align=right | 1.3 km || 
|-id=834 bgcolor=#fefefe
| 181834 ||  || — || September 26, 1998 || Socorro || LINEAR || — || align=right | 1.5 km || 
|-id=835 bgcolor=#fefefe
| 181835 ||  || — || September 26, 1998 || Socorro || LINEAR || — || align=right | 1.5 km || 
|-id=836 bgcolor=#d6d6d6
| 181836 ||  || — || September 26, 1998 || Socorro || LINEAR || — || align=right | 5.6 km || 
|-id=837 bgcolor=#d6d6d6
| 181837 ||  || — || September 26, 1998 || Socorro || LINEAR || — || align=right | 7.0 km || 
|-id=838 bgcolor=#d6d6d6
| 181838 ||  || — || September 18, 1998 || Catalina || CSS || — || align=right | 5.3 km || 
|-id=839 bgcolor=#fefefe
| 181839 ||  || — || October 14, 1998 || Socorro || LINEAR || — || align=right | 1.8 km || 
|-id=840 bgcolor=#fefefe
| 181840 ||  || — || October 13, 1998 || Kitt Peak || Spacewatch || — || align=right | 1.3 km || 
|-id=841 bgcolor=#fefefe
| 181841 ||  || — || October 14, 1998 || Kitt Peak || Spacewatch || NYS || align=right | 1.1 km || 
|-id=842 bgcolor=#fefefe
| 181842 ||  || — || October 15, 1998 || Caussols || ODAS || NYS || align=right | 1.2 km || 
|-id=843 bgcolor=#E9E9E9
| 181843 ||  || — || October 13, 1998 || Kitt Peak || Spacewatch || — || align=right | 2.8 km || 
|-id=844 bgcolor=#fefefe
| 181844 ||  || — || October 15, 1998 || Kitt Peak || Spacewatch || V || align=right | 1.1 km || 
|-id=845 bgcolor=#fefefe
| 181845 ||  || — || October 11, 1998 || Anderson Mesa || LONEOS || — || align=right | 1.5 km || 
|-id=846 bgcolor=#fefefe
| 181846 ||  || — || October 20, 1998 || Caussols || ODAS || — || align=right | 1.3 km || 
|-id=847 bgcolor=#d6d6d6
| 181847 ||  || — || October 16, 1998 || Kitt Peak || Spacewatch || 7:4 || align=right | 6.9 km || 
|-id=848 bgcolor=#fefefe
| 181848 ||  || — || October 23, 1998 || Kitt Peak || Spacewatch || — || align=right | 1.4 km || 
|-id=849 bgcolor=#fefefe
| 181849 ||  || — || October 17, 1998 || Xinglong || SCAP || — || align=right | 1.6 km || 
|-id=850 bgcolor=#fefefe
| 181850 ||  || — || October 24, 1998 || Kitt Peak || Spacewatch || V || align=right | 1.1 km || 
|-id=851 bgcolor=#fefefe
| 181851 ||  || — || October 17, 1998 || Anderson Mesa || LONEOS || — || align=right | 1.6 km || 
|-id=852 bgcolor=#fefefe
| 181852 ||  || — || November 10, 1998 || Socorro || LINEAR || NYS || align=right | 1.2 km || 
|-id=853 bgcolor=#E9E9E9
| 181853 ||  || — || November 21, 1998 || Socorro || LINEAR || — || align=right | 1.3 km || 
|-id=854 bgcolor=#E9E9E9
| 181854 ||  || — || November 21, 1998 || Socorro || LINEAR || — || align=right | 1.2 km || 
|-id=855 bgcolor=#C2E0FF
| 181855 ||  || — || November 18, 1998 || Kitt Peak || M. W. Buie || other TNOcritical || align=right | 128 km || 
|-id=856 bgcolor=#E9E9E9
| 181856 ||  || — || December 9, 1998 || Oizumi || T. Kobayashi || — || align=right | 1.7 km || 
|-id=857 bgcolor=#E9E9E9
| 181857 ||  || — || December 8, 1998 || Kitt Peak || Spacewatch || — || align=right | 1.1 km || 
|-id=858 bgcolor=#fefefe
| 181858 ||  || — || December 8, 1998 || Kitt Peak || Spacewatch || MAS || align=right | 1.1 km || 
|-id=859 bgcolor=#fefefe
| 181859 ||  || — || December 8, 1998 || Caussols || ODAS || — || align=right | 2.3 km || 
|-id=860 bgcolor=#E9E9E9
| 181860 ||  || — || December 10, 1998 || Kitt Peak || Spacewatch || — || align=right | 2.1 km || 
|-id=861 bgcolor=#E9E9E9
| 181861 ||  || — || December 14, 1998 || Socorro || LINEAR || — || align=right | 3.1 km || 
|-id=862 bgcolor=#E9E9E9
| 181862 ||  || — || December 14, 1998 || Socorro || LINEAR || — || align=right | 2.4 km || 
|-id=863 bgcolor=#E9E9E9
| 181863 ||  || — || December 12, 1998 || Socorro || LINEAR || — || align=right | 3.6 km || 
|-id=864 bgcolor=#E9E9E9
| 181864 ||  || — || January 10, 1999 || Xinglong || SCAP || — || align=right | 2.3 km || 
|-id=865 bgcolor=#E9E9E9
| 181865 ||  || — || January 19, 1999 || Kitt Peak || Spacewatch || — || align=right | 1.5 km || 
|-id=866 bgcolor=#E9E9E9
| 181866 ||  || — || February 14, 1999 || Caussols || ODAS || — || align=right | 2.8 km || 
|-id=867 bgcolor=#C2E0FF
| 181867 ||  || — || February 10, 1999 || Mauna Kea || D. C. Jewitt, C. Trujillo, J. X. Luu || res3:7 || align=right | 147 km || 
|-id=868 bgcolor=#C2E0FF
| 181868 ||  || — || February 11, 1999 || Mauna Kea || J. X. Luu, C. Trujillo, D. C. Jewitt || SDOcritical || align=right | 141 km || 
|-id=869 bgcolor=#E9E9E9
| 181869 ||  || — || February 11, 1999 || Socorro || LINEAR || ADE || align=right | 3.6 km || 
|-id=870 bgcolor=#E9E9E9
| 181870 ||  || — || February 8, 1999 || Kitt Peak || Spacewatch || — || align=right | 2.6 km || 
|-id=871 bgcolor=#C2E0FF
| 181871 ||  || — || February 12, 1999 || Mauna Kea || C. Trujillo, J. X. Luu, D. C. Jewitt || res4:7critical || align=right | 152 km || 
|-id=872 bgcolor=#E9E9E9
| 181872 Cathaysa ||  ||  || March 21, 1999 || Apache Point || SDSS || — || align=right | 3.4 km || 
|-id=873 bgcolor=#E9E9E9
| 181873 ||  || — || April 12, 1999 || Kitt Peak || Spacewatch || — || align=right | 3.4 km || 
|-id=874 bgcolor=#C2E0FF
| 181874 ||  || — || April 18, 1999 || Kitt Peak || Kitt Peak Obs. || other TNO || align=right | 176 km || 
|-id=875 bgcolor=#fefefe
| 181875 ||  || — || May 13, 1999 || Socorro || LINEAR || FLO || align=right | 1.2 km || 
|-id=876 bgcolor=#E9E9E9
| 181876 ||  || — || May 12, 1999 || Socorro || LINEAR || — || align=right | 3.4 km || 
|-id=877 bgcolor=#fefefe
| 181877 ||  || — || June 11, 1999 || Catalina || CSS || — || align=right | 1.1 km || 
|-id=878 bgcolor=#d6d6d6
| 181878 || 1999 OT || — || July 17, 1999 || Bergisch Gladbach || W. Bickel || — || align=right | 3.3 km || 
|-id=879 bgcolor=#fefefe
| 181879 ||  || — || August 9, 1999 || Prescott || P. G. Comba || FLO || align=right data-sort-value="0.97" | 970 m || 
|-id=880 bgcolor=#fefefe
| 181880 ||  || — || August 6, 1999 || Cerro Tololo || J. W. Parker || NYS || align=right data-sort-value="0.91" | 910 m || 
|-id=881 bgcolor=#fefefe
| 181881 ||  || — || August 8, 1999 || Anderson Mesa || LONEOS || — || align=right | 1.1 km || 
|-id=882 bgcolor=#FA8072
| 181882 ||  || — || September 7, 1999 || Socorro || LINEAR || PHO || align=right | 3.4 km || 
|-id=883 bgcolor=#fefefe
| 181883 ||  || — || September 7, 1999 || Socorro || LINEAR || PHO || align=right | 1.3 km || 
|-id=884 bgcolor=#d6d6d6
| 181884 ||  || — || September 8, 1999 || Ondřejov || L. Kotková || TIR || align=right | 2.6 km || 
|-id=885 bgcolor=#fefefe
| 181885 ||  || — || September 9, 1999 || Višnjan Observatory || K. Korlević || — || align=right | 1.1 km || 
|-id=886 bgcolor=#fefefe
| 181886 ||  || — || September 9, 1999 || Eskridge || G. Bell, G. Hug || — || align=right | 1.2 km || 
|-id=887 bgcolor=#fefefe
| 181887 ||  || — || September 7, 1999 || Socorro || LINEAR || FLO || align=right | 1.0 km || 
|-id=888 bgcolor=#fefefe
| 181888 ||  || — || September 7, 1999 || Socorro || LINEAR || — || align=right data-sort-value="0.96" | 960 m || 
|-id=889 bgcolor=#fefefe
| 181889 ||  || — || September 7, 1999 || Socorro || LINEAR || — || align=right | 1.6 km || 
|-id=890 bgcolor=#fefefe
| 181890 ||  || — || September 7, 1999 || Socorro || LINEAR || — || align=right | 1.1 km || 
|-id=891 bgcolor=#fefefe
| 181891 ||  || — || September 8, 1999 || Socorro || LINEAR || — || align=right | 1.5 km || 
|-id=892 bgcolor=#fefefe
| 181892 ||  || — || September 9, 1999 || Socorro || LINEAR || FLO || align=right data-sort-value="0.98" | 980 m || 
|-id=893 bgcolor=#fefefe
| 181893 ||  || — || September 9, 1999 || Socorro || LINEAR || — || align=right | 1.0 km || 
|-id=894 bgcolor=#fefefe
| 181894 ||  || — || September 9, 1999 || Socorro || LINEAR || — || align=right | 1.4 km || 
|-id=895 bgcolor=#fefefe
| 181895 ||  || — || September 9, 1999 || Socorro || LINEAR || FLO || align=right data-sort-value="0.94" | 940 m || 
|-id=896 bgcolor=#fefefe
| 181896 ||  || — || September 9, 1999 || Socorro || LINEAR || — || align=right | 1.5 km || 
|-id=897 bgcolor=#fefefe
| 181897 ||  || — || September 9, 1999 || Socorro || LINEAR || — || align=right | 1.3 km || 
|-id=898 bgcolor=#FA8072
| 181898 ||  || — || September 9, 1999 || Socorro || LINEAR || — || align=right | 1.2 km || 
|-id=899 bgcolor=#fefefe
| 181899 ||  || — || September 9, 1999 || Socorro || LINEAR || — || align=right | 1.3 km || 
|-id=900 bgcolor=#d6d6d6
| 181900 ||  || — || September 9, 1999 || Socorro || LINEAR || — || align=right | 5.2 km || 
|}

181901–182000 

|-bgcolor=#fefefe
| 181901 ||  || — || September 6, 1999 || Anderson Mesa || LONEOS || FLO || align=right data-sort-value="0.88" | 880 m || 
|-id=902 bgcolor=#C2E0FF
| 181902 ||  || — || September 6, 1999 || Mauna Kea || C. Trujillo, J. X. Luu, D. C. Jewitt || SDOcritical || align=right | 155 km || 
|-id=903 bgcolor=#fefefe
| 181903 ||  || — || September 8, 1999 || Catalina || CSS || — || align=right | 1.6 km || 
|-id=904 bgcolor=#fefefe
| 181904 ||  || — || September 8, 1999 || Catalina || CSS || — || align=right | 3.1 km || 
|-id=905 bgcolor=#fefefe
| 181905 ||  || — || September 20, 1999 || Ondřejov || L. Kotková || — || align=right | 1.1 km || 
|-id=906 bgcolor=#d6d6d6
| 181906 ||  || — || September 29, 1999 || Višnjan Observatory || K. Korlević || — || align=right | 3.2 km || 
|-id=907 bgcolor=#fefefe
| 181907 ||  || — || September 29, 1999 || Catalina || CSS || — || align=right | 1.7 km || 
|-id=908 bgcolor=#fefefe
| 181908 ||  || — || September 29, 1999 || Catalina || CSS || — || align=right | 1.2 km || 
|-id=909 bgcolor=#d6d6d6
| 181909 ||  || — || October 12, 1999 || Ondřejov || P. Pravec, P. Kušnirák || — || align=right | 3.8 km || 
|-id=910 bgcolor=#fefefe
| 181910 ||  || — || October 2, 1999 || Socorro || LINEAR || — || align=right | 3.0 km || 
|-id=911 bgcolor=#d6d6d6
| 181911 ||  || — || October 3, 1999 || Catalina || CSS || — || align=right | 3.9 km || 
|-id=912 bgcolor=#fefefe
| 181912 ||  || — || October 2, 1999 || Kitt Peak || Spacewatch || NYS || align=right data-sort-value="0.79" | 790 m || 
|-id=913 bgcolor=#fefefe
| 181913 ||  || — || October 3, 1999 || Kitt Peak || Spacewatch || FLO || align=right data-sort-value="0.86" | 860 m || 
|-id=914 bgcolor=#fefefe
| 181914 ||  || — || October 4, 1999 || Kitt Peak || Spacewatch || NYS || align=right data-sort-value="0.82" | 820 m || 
|-id=915 bgcolor=#d6d6d6
| 181915 ||  || — || October 4, 1999 || Kitt Peak || Spacewatch || — || align=right | 4.2 km || 
|-id=916 bgcolor=#d6d6d6
| 181916 ||  || — || October 6, 1999 || Kitt Peak || Spacewatch || — || align=right | 4.1 km || 
|-id=917 bgcolor=#d6d6d6
| 181917 ||  || — || October 9, 1999 || Kitt Peak || Spacewatch || THM || align=right | 2.9 km || 
|-id=918 bgcolor=#fefefe
| 181918 ||  || — || October 10, 1999 || Kitt Peak || Spacewatch || FLO || align=right data-sort-value="0.79" | 790 m || 
|-id=919 bgcolor=#fefefe
| 181919 ||  || — || October 10, 1999 || Kitt Peak || Spacewatch || FLO || align=right | 1.0 km || 
|-id=920 bgcolor=#d6d6d6
| 181920 ||  || — || October 11, 1999 || Kitt Peak || Spacewatch || — || align=right | 3.5 km || 
|-id=921 bgcolor=#d6d6d6
| 181921 ||  || — || October 11, 1999 || Kitt Peak || Spacewatch || HYG || align=right | 3.4 km || 
|-id=922 bgcolor=#fefefe
| 181922 ||  || — || October 11, 1999 || Kitt Peak || Spacewatch || — || align=right data-sort-value="0.96" | 960 m || 
|-id=923 bgcolor=#fefefe
| 181923 ||  || — || October 3, 1999 || Socorro || LINEAR || — || align=right | 1.2 km || 
|-id=924 bgcolor=#fefefe
| 181924 ||  || — || October 4, 1999 || Socorro || LINEAR || — || align=right | 1.7 km || 
|-id=925 bgcolor=#d6d6d6
| 181925 ||  || — || October 4, 1999 || Socorro || LINEAR || — || align=right | 4.2 km || 
|-id=926 bgcolor=#fefefe
| 181926 ||  || — || October 6, 1999 || Socorro || LINEAR || — || align=right | 1.2 km || 
|-id=927 bgcolor=#d6d6d6
| 181927 ||  || — || October 6, 1999 || Socorro || LINEAR || — || align=right | 3.4 km || 
|-id=928 bgcolor=#fefefe
| 181928 ||  || — || October 6, 1999 || Socorro || LINEAR || FLO || align=right | 1.1 km || 
|-id=929 bgcolor=#d6d6d6
| 181929 ||  || — || October 6, 1999 || Socorro || LINEAR || — || align=right | 4.6 km || 
|-id=930 bgcolor=#d6d6d6
| 181930 ||  || — || October 6, 1999 || Socorro || LINEAR || EUP || align=right | 7.6 km || 
|-id=931 bgcolor=#d6d6d6
| 181931 ||  || — || October 6, 1999 || Socorro || LINEAR || — || align=right | 5.1 km || 
|-id=932 bgcolor=#fefefe
| 181932 ||  || — || October 6, 1999 || Socorro || LINEAR || FLO || align=right | 1.00 km || 
|-id=933 bgcolor=#fefefe
| 181933 ||  || — || October 7, 1999 || Socorro || LINEAR || FLO || align=right | 1.0 km || 
|-id=934 bgcolor=#fefefe
| 181934 ||  || — || October 7, 1999 || Socorro || LINEAR || NYS || align=right data-sort-value="0.95" | 950 m || 
|-id=935 bgcolor=#fefefe
| 181935 ||  || — || October 7, 1999 || Socorro || LINEAR || — || align=right | 1.4 km || 
|-id=936 bgcolor=#fefefe
| 181936 ||  || — || October 7, 1999 || Socorro || LINEAR || NYS || align=right data-sort-value="0.92" | 920 m || 
|-id=937 bgcolor=#d6d6d6
| 181937 ||  || — || October 9, 1999 || Socorro || LINEAR || — || align=right | 3.9 km || 
|-id=938 bgcolor=#d6d6d6
| 181938 ||  || — || October 9, 1999 || Socorro || LINEAR || VER || align=right | 5.3 km || 
|-id=939 bgcolor=#d6d6d6
| 181939 ||  || — || October 9, 1999 || Socorro || LINEAR || — || align=right | 3.4 km || 
|-id=940 bgcolor=#d6d6d6
| 181940 ||  || — || October 10, 1999 || Socorro || LINEAR || 3:2 || align=right | 8.1 km || 
|-id=941 bgcolor=#d6d6d6
| 181941 ||  || — || October 10, 1999 || Socorro || LINEAR || HYG || align=right | 5.5 km || 
|-id=942 bgcolor=#fefefe
| 181942 ||  || — || October 10, 1999 || Socorro || LINEAR || — || align=right | 1.5 km || 
|-id=943 bgcolor=#d6d6d6
| 181943 ||  || — || October 10, 1999 || Socorro || LINEAR || — || align=right | 4.4 km || 
|-id=944 bgcolor=#fefefe
| 181944 ||  || — || October 10, 1999 || Socorro || LINEAR || NYS || align=right | 1.2 km || 
|-id=945 bgcolor=#fefefe
| 181945 ||  || — || October 13, 1999 || Socorro || LINEAR || — || align=right | 1.1 km || 
|-id=946 bgcolor=#fefefe
| 181946 ||  || — || October 13, 1999 || Socorro || LINEAR || — || align=right | 1.4 km || 
|-id=947 bgcolor=#d6d6d6
| 181947 ||  || — || October 15, 1999 || Socorro || LINEAR || — || align=right | 5.6 km || 
|-id=948 bgcolor=#fefefe
| 181948 ||  || — || October 15, 1999 || Socorro || LINEAR || — || align=right | 1.2 km || 
|-id=949 bgcolor=#fefefe
| 181949 ||  || — || October 1, 1999 || Catalina || CSS || — || align=right | 1.1 km || 
|-id=950 bgcolor=#d6d6d6
| 181950 ||  || — || October 2, 1999 || Kitt Peak || Spacewatch || — || align=right | 4.8 km || 
|-id=951 bgcolor=#fefefe
| 181951 ||  || — || October 1, 1999 || Kitt Peak || Spacewatch || — || align=right | 1.2 km || 
|-id=952 bgcolor=#fefefe
| 181952 ||  || — || October 5, 1999 || Catalina || CSS || — || align=right | 1.4 km || 
|-id=953 bgcolor=#d6d6d6
| 181953 ||  || — || October 7, 1999 || Catalina || CSS || HYG || align=right | 5.4 km || 
|-id=954 bgcolor=#fefefe
| 181954 ||  || — || October 15, 1999 || Kitt Peak || Spacewatch || NYS || align=right data-sort-value="0.91" | 910 m || 
|-id=955 bgcolor=#fefefe
| 181955 ||  || — || October 3, 1999 || Socorro || LINEAR || FLO || align=right | 1.0 km || 
|-id=956 bgcolor=#fefefe
| 181956 ||  || — || October 10, 1999 || Socorro || LINEAR || — || align=right data-sort-value="0.91" | 910 m || 
|-id=957 bgcolor=#fefefe
| 181957 ||  || — || October 10, 1999 || Socorro || LINEAR || NYS || align=right data-sort-value="0.91" | 910 m || 
|-id=958 bgcolor=#FA8072
| 181958 ||  || — || October 30, 1999 || Socorro || LINEAR || — || align=right | 2.4 km || 
|-id=959 bgcolor=#fefefe
| 181959 ||  || — || October 31, 1999 || Kitt Peak || Spacewatch || NYS || align=right data-sort-value="0.84" | 840 m || 
|-id=960 bgcolor=#d6d6d6
| 181960 ||  || — || October 28, 1999 || Catalina || CSS || ALA || align=right | 7.5 km || 
|-id=961 bgcolor=#fefefe
| 181961 ||  || — || October 31, 1999 || Kitt Peak || Spacewatch || — || align=right data-sort-value="0.85" | 850 m || 
|-id=962 bgcolor=#fefefe
| 181962 ||  || — || October 31, 1999 || Kitt Peak || Spacewatch || — || align=right | 1.2 km || 
|-id=963 bgcolor=#d6d6d6
| 181963 ||  || — || October 16, 1999 || Kitt Peak || Spacewatch || — || align=right | 4.3 km || 
|-id=964 bgcolor=#d6d6d6
| 181964 ||  || — || October 16, 1999 || Socorro || LINEAR || URS || align=right | 6.9 km || 
|-id=965 bgcolor=#fefefe
| 181965 ||  || — || October 18, 1999 || Kitt Peak || Spacewatch || V || align=right | 1.1 km || 
|-id=966 bgcolor=#fefefe
| 181966 ||  || — || October 20, 1999 || Socorro || LINEAR || FLO || align=right | 1.7 km || 
|-id=967 bgcolor=#fefefe
| 181967 ||  || — || October 30, 1999 || Catalina || CSS || FLO || align=right data-sort-value="0.96" | 960 m || 
|-id=968 bgcolor=#d6d6d6
| 181968 ||  || — || October 30, 1999 || Socorro || LINEAR || TIR || align=right | 5.5 km || 
|-id=969 bgcolor=#fefefe
| 181969 ||  || — || November 2, 1999 || Kitt Peak || Spacewatch || FLO || align=right data-sort-value="0.76" | 760 m || 
|-id=970 bgcolor=#fefefe
| 181970 ||  || — || November 2, 1999 || Kitt Peak || Spacewatch || FLO || align=right data-sort-value="0.84" | 840 m || 
|-id=971 bgcolor=#fefefe
| 181971 ||  || — || November 2, 1999 || Kitt Peak || Spacewatch || NYS || align=right data-sort-value="0.88" | 880 m || 
|-id=972 bgcolor=#fefefe
| 181972 ||  || — || November 12, 1999 || Farra d'Isonzo || Farra d'Isonzo || NYS || align=right data-sort-value="0.96" | 960 m || 
|-id=973 bgcolor=#fefefe
| 181973 ||  || — || November 3, 1999 || Socorro || LINEAR || — || align=right | 2.4 km || 
|-id=974 bgcolor=#fefefe
| 181974 ||  || — || November 3, 1999 || Socorro || LINEAR || FLO || align=right | 1.1 km || 
|-id=975 bgcolor=#fefefe
| 181975 ||  || — || November 3, 1999 || Socorro || LINEAR || NYS || align=right | 1.1 km || 
|-id=976 bgcolor=#fefefe
| 181976 ||  || — || November 4, 1999 || Catalina || CSS || NYS || align=right | 1.1 km || 
|-id=977 bgcolor=#d6d6d6
| 181977 ||  || — || November 4, 1999 || Socorro || LINEAR || — || align=right | 4.2 km || 
|-id=978 bgcolor=#d6d6d6
| 181978 ||  || — || November 4, 1999 || Socorro || LINEAR || EOS || align=right | 3.7 km || 
|-id=979 bgcolor=#fefefe
| 181979 ||  || — || November 4, 1999 || Socorro || LINEAR || — || align=right | 1.3 km || 
|-id=980 bgcolor=#fefefe
| 181980 ||  || — || November 4, 1999 || Socorro || LINEAR || NYS || align=right data-sort-value="0.81" | 810 m || 
|-id=981 bgcolor=#d6d6d6
| 181981 ||  || — || November 4, 1999 || Socorro || LINEAR || — || align=right | 3.9 km || 
|-id=982 bgcolor=#d6d6d6
| 181982 ||  || — || November 5, 1999 || Kitt Peak || Spacewatch || HYG || align=right | 4.4 km || 
|-id=983 bgcolor=#E9E9E9
| 181983 ||  || — || November 4, 1999 || Socorro || LINEAR || — || align=right | 2.3 km || 
|-id=984 bgcolor=#fefefe
| 181984 ||  || — || November 5, 1999 || Socorro || LINEAR || — || align=right | 1.8 km || 
|-id=985 bgcolor=#fefefe
| 181985 ||  || — || November 9, 1999 || Socorro || LINEAR || — || align=right | 1.1 km || 
|-id=986 bgcolor=#d6d6d6
| 181986 ||  || — || November 9, 1999 || Socorro || LINEAR || THM || align=right | 3.4 km || 
|-id=987 bgcolor=#fefefe
| 181987 ||  || — || November 9, 1999 || Socorro || LINEAR || NYS || align=right data-sort-value="0.87" | 870 m || 
|-id=988 bgcolor=#fefefe
| 181988 ||  || — || November 9, 1999 || Socorro || LINEAR || NYS || align=right data-sort-value="0.82" | 820 m || 
|-id=989 bgcolor=#fefefe
| 181989 ||  || — || November 9, 1999 || Socorro || LINEAR || EUT || align=right data-sort-value="0.88" | 880 m || 
|-id=990 bgcolor=#fefefe
| 181990 ||  || — || November 9, 1999 || Socorro || LINEAR || — || align=right | 1.2 km || 
|-id=991 bgcolor=#fefefe
| 181991 ||  || — || November 4, 1999 || Kitt Peak || Spacewatch || NYS || align=right data-sort-value="0.73" | 730 m || 
|-id=992 bgcolor=#d6d6d6
| 181992 ||  || — || November 9, 1999 || Kitt Peak || Spacewatch || VER || align=right | 4.0 km || 
|-id=993 bgcolor=#d6d6d6
| 181993 ||  || — || November 9, 1999 || Kitt Peak || Spacewatch || HYG || align=right | 4.2 km || 
|-id=994 bgcolor=#fefefe
| 181994 ||  || — || November 14, 1999 || Socorro || LINEAR || — || align=right | 1.2 km || 
|-id=995 bgcolor=#E9E9E9
| 181995 ||  || — || November 14, 1999 || Socorro || LINEAR || — || align=right | 1.8 km || 
|-id=996 bgcolor=#fefefe
| 181996 ||  || — || November 14, 1999 || Socorro || LINEAR || — || align=right | 1.1 km || 
|-id=997 bgcolor=#fefefe
| 181997 ||  || — || November 6, 1999 || Socorro || LINEAR || — || align=right | 1.1 km || 
|-id=998 bgcolor=#fefefe
| 181998 ||  || — || November 12, 1999 || Socorro || LINEAR || V || align=right data-sort-value="0.97" | 970 m || 
|-id=999 bgcolor=#fefefe
| 181999 ||  || — || November 29, 1999 || Kitt Peak || Spacewatch || — || align=right | 1.1 km || 
|-id=000 bgcolor=#d6d6d6
| 182000 ||  || — || November 16, 1999 || Kitt Peak || Spacewatch || URS || align=right | 5.0 km || 
|}

References

External links 
 Discovery Circumstances: Numbered Minor Planets (180001)–(185000) (IAU Minor Planet Center)

0181